

152001–152100 

|-bgcolor=#fefefe
| 152001 ||  || — || May 13, 2004 || Kitt Peak || Spacewatch || — || align=right | 1.6 km || 
|-id=002 bgcolor=#d6d6d6
| 152002 ||  || — || May 13, 2004 || Palomar || NEAT || — || align=right | 4.8 km || 
|-id=003 bgcolor=#E9E9E9
| 152003 ||  || — || May 9, 2004 || Kitt Peak || Spacewatch || — || align=right | 2.1 km || 
|-id=004 bgcolor=#fefefe
| 152004 ||  || — || May 15, 2004 || Socorro || LINEAR || NYS || align=right | 1.0 km || 
|-id=005 bgcolor=#E9E9E9
| 152005 ||  || — || May 15, 2004 || Socorro || LINEAR || — || align=right | 3.2 km || 
|-id=006 bgcolor=#fefefe
| 152006 ||  || — || May 15, 2004 || Socorro || LINEAR || — || align=right | 1.5 km || 
|-id=007 bgcolor=#E9E9E9
| 152007 ||  || — || May 15, 2004 || Socorro || LINEAR || — || align=right | 2.7 km || 
|-id=008 bgcolor=#fefefe
| 152008 ||  || — || May 15, 2004 || Socorro || LINEAR || V || align=right | 1.0 km || 
|-id=009 bgcolor=#fefefe
| 152009 ||  || — || May 15, 2004 || Socorro || LINEAR || V || align=right | 1.1 km || 
|-id=010 bgcolor=#E9E9E9
| 152010 ||  || — || May 15, 2004 || Socorro || LINEAR || — || align=right | 1.8 km || 
|-id=011 bgcolor=#E9E9E9
| 152011 ||  || — || May 15, 2004 || Socorro || LINEAR || — || align=right | 2.6 km || 
|-id=012 bgcolor=#fefefe
| 152012 ||  || — || May 15, 2004 || Socorro || LINEAR || — || align=right | 1.8 km || 
|-id=013 bgcolor=#E9E9E9
| 152013 ||  || — || May 13, 2004 || Anderson Mesa || LONEOS || — || align=right | 1.5 km || 
|-id=014 bgcolor=#d6d6d6
| 152014 ||  || — || May 15, 2004 || Socorro || LINEAR || — || align=right | 4.4 km || 
|-id=015 bgcolor=#fefefe
| 152015 ||  || — || May 15, 2004 || Socorro || LINEAR || — || align=right | 1.3 km || 
|-id=016 bgcolor=#fefefe
| 152016 ||  || — || May 14, 2004 || Socorro || LINEAR || V || align=right | 1.1 km || 
|-id=017 bgcolor=#E9E9E9
| 152017 ||  || — || May 18, 2004 || Socorro || LINEAR || NEM || align=right | 3.4 km || 
|-id=018 bgcolor=#fefefe
| 152018 ||  || — || May 18, 2004 || Socorro || LINEAR || — || align=right | 1.1 km || 
|-id=019 bgcolor=#E9E9E9
| 152019 ||  || — || May 20, 2004 || Siding Spring || SSS || — || align=right | 4.2 km || 
|-id=020 bgcolor=#fefefe
| 152020 ||  || — || May 21, 2004 || Catalina || CSS || — || align=right | 1.6 km || 
|-id=021 bgcolor=#E9E9E9
| 152021 ||  || — || June 10, 2004 || Reedy Creek || J. Broughton || — || align=right | 1.6 km || 
|-id=022 bgcolor=#fefefe
| 152022 ||  || — || June 15, 2004 || Socorro || LINEAR || — || align=right | 1.7 km || 
|-id=023 bgcolor=#E9E9E9
| 152023 ||  || — || June 21, 2004 || Socorro || LINEAR || MIT || align=right | 5.7 km || 
|-id=024 bgcolor=#d6d6d6
| 152024 ||  || — || June 24, 2004 || Bergisch Gladbach || W. Bickel || EOS || align=right | 3.0 km || 
|-id=025 bgcolor=#E9E9E9
| 152025 || 2004 NP || — || July 8, 2004 || Reedy Creek || J. Broughton || — || align=right | 1.6 km || 
|-id=026 bgcolor=#fefefe
| 152026 ||  || — || July 11, 2004 || Socorro || LINEAR || NYS || align=right | 1.2 km || 
|-id=027 bgcolor=#fefefe
| 152027 ||  || — || July 11, 2004 || Socorro || LINEAR || NYS || align=right | 1.3 km || 
|-id=028 bgcolor=#E9E9E9
| 152028 ||  || — || July 14, 2004 || Socorro || LINEAR || — || align=right | 4.4 km || 
|-id=029 bgcolor=#E9E9E9
| 152029 ||  || — || July 14, 2004 || Socorro || LINEAR || NEM || align=right | 3.8 km || 
|-id=030 bgcolor=#fefefe
| 152030 ||  || — || July 15, 2004 || Socorro || LINEAR || — || align=right | 1.7 km || 
|-id=031 bgcolor=#E9E9E9
| 152031 ||  || — || July 14, 2004 || Socorro || LINEAR || — || align=right | 1.6 km || 
|-id=032 bgcolor=#E9E9E9
| 152032 ||  || — || July 14, 2004 || Socorro || LINEAR || — || align=right | 2.1 km || 
|-id=033 bgcolor=#E9E9E9
| 152033 ||  || — || July 11, 2004 || Socorro || LINEAR || HNA || align=right | 3.6 km || 
|-id=034 bgcolor=#E9E9E9
| 152034 ||  || — || July 11, 2004 || Socorro || LINEAR || WIT || align=right | 1.4 km || 
|-id=035 bgcolor=#fefefe
| 152035 ||  || — || July 14, 2004 || Socorro || LINEAR || — || align=right | 1.6 km || 
|-id=036 bgcolor=#E9E9E9
| 152036 ||  || — || July 16, 2004 || Socorro || LINEAR || — || align=right | 3.6 km || 
|-id=037 bgcolor=#d6d6d6
| 152037 ||  || — || July 25, 2004 || Anderson Mesa || LONEOS || — || align=right | 7.2 km || 
|-id=038 bgcolor=#fefefe
| 152038 ||  || — || July 27, 2004 || Socorro || LINEAR || MAS || align=right | 1.3 km || 
|-id=039 bgcolor=#d6d6d6
| 152039 ||  || — || August 6, 2004 || Palomar || NEAT || — || align=right | 2.7 km || 
|-id=040 bgcolor=#d6d6d6
| 152040 ||  || — || August 6, 2004 || Campo Imperatore || CINEOS || — || align=right | 3.6 km || 
|-id=041 bgcolor=#fefefe
| 152041 ||  || — || August 7, 2004 || Palomar || NEAT || — || align=right | 1.5 km || 
|-id=042 bgcolor=#d6d6d6
| 152042 ||  || — || August 7, 2004 || Palomar || NEAT || — || align=right | 5.1 km || 
|-id=043 bgcolor=#d6d6d6
| 152043 ||  || — || August 6, 2004 || Palomar || NEAT || — || align=right | 6.6 km || 
|-id=044 bgcolor=#d6d6d6
| 152044 ||  || — || August 8, 2004 || Palomar || NEAT || — || align=right | 4.6 km || 
|-id=045 bgcolor=#d6d6d6
| 152045 ||  || — || August 8, 2004 || Socorro || LINEAR || — || align=right | 4.4 km || 
|-id=046 bgcolor=#E9E9E9
| 152046 ||  || — || August 7, 2004 || Palomar || NEAT || GEF || align=right | 2.1 km || 
|-id=047 bgcolor=#d6d6d6
| 152047 ||  || — || August 8, 2004 || Socorro || LINEAR || — || align=right | 3.0 km || 
|-id=048 bgcolor=#d6d6d6
| 152048 ||  || — || August 9, 2004 || Socorro || LINEAR || KOR || align=right | 2.3 km || 
|-id=049 bgcolor=#E9E9E9
| 152049 ||  || — || August 9, 2004 || Socorro || LINEAR || — || align=right | 4.4 km || 
|-id=050 bgcolor=#d6d6d6
| 152050 ||  || — || August 9, 2004 || Anderson Mesa || LONEOS || THM || align=right | 5.6 km || 
|-id=051 bgcolor=#E9E9E9
| 152051 ||  || — || August 9, 2004 || Socorro || LINEAR || — || align=right | 3.3 km || 
|-id=052 bgcolor=#E9E9E9
| 152052 ||  || — || August 9, 2004 || Socorro || LINEAR || — || align=right | 4.5 km || 
|-id=053 bgcolor=#E9E9E9
| 152053 ||  || — || August 7, 2004 || Palomar || NEAT || — || align=right | 3.0 km || 
|-id=054 bgcolor=#d6d6d6
| 152054 ||  || — || August 8, 2004 || Socorro || LINEAR || — || align=right | 4.0 km || 
|-id=055 bgcolor=#E9E9E9
| 152055 ||  || — || August 8, 2004 || Anderson Mesa || LONEOS || — || align=right | 1.5 km || 
|-id=056 bgcolor=#d6d6d6
| 152056 ||  || — || August 7, 2004 || Palomar || NEAT || — || align=right | 3.6 km || 
|-id=057 bgcolor=#E9E9E9
| 152057 ||  || — || August 8, 2004 || Socorro || LINEAR || — || align=right | 4.9 km || 
|-id=058 bgcolor=#E9E9E9
| 152058 ||  || — || August 8, 2004 || Socorro || LINEAR || — || align=right | 2.4 km || 
|-id=059 bgcolor=#E9E9E9
| 152059 ||  || — || August 8, 2004 || Anderson Mesa || LONEOS || — || align=right | 2.6 km || 
|-id=060 bgcolor=#d6d6d6
| 152060 ||  || — || August 9, 2004 || Anderson Mesa || LONEOS || — || align=right | 4.7 km || 
|-id=061 bgcolor=#d6d6d6
| 152061 ||  || — || August 9, 2004 || Socorro || LINEAR || — || align=right | 3.4 km || 
|-id=062 bgcolor=#E9E9E9
| 152062 ||  || — || August 9, 2004 || Socorro || LINEAR || — || align=right | 1.8 km || 
|-id=063 bgcolor=#E9E9E9
| 152063 ||  || — || August 10, 2004 || Socorro || LINEAR || — || align=right | 4.4 km || 
|-id=064 bgcolor=#E9E9E9
| 152064 ||  || — || August 10, 2004 || Socorro || LINEAR || — || align=right | 3.7 km || 
|-id=065 bgcolor=#d6d6d6
| 152065 ||  || — || August 10, 2004 || Socorro || LINEAR || KOR || align=right | 2.2 km || 
|-id=066 bgcolor=#E9E9E9
| 152066 ||  || — || August 10, 2004 || Socorro || LINEAR || fast? || align=right | 1.5 km || 
|-id=067 bgcolor=#d6d6d6
| 152067 Deboy ||  ||  || August 15, 2004 || Cerro Tololo || M. W. Buie || — || align=right | 3.2 km || 
|-id=068 bgcolor=#d6d6d6
| 152068 ||  || — || August 21, 2004 || Siding Spring || SSS || — || align=right | 5.4 km || 
|-id=069 bgcolor=#d6d6d6
| 152069 ||  || — || August 25, 2004 || Kitt Peak || Spacewatch || — || align=right | 4.1 km || 
|-id=070 bgcolor=#E9E9E9
| 152070 ||  || — || September 4, 2004 || Palomar || NEAT || HNS || align=right | 2.1 km || 
|-id=071 bgcolor=#E9E9E9
| 152071 ||  || — || September 6, 2004 || Saint-Véran || Saint-Véran Obs. || — || align=right | 1.9 km || 
|-id=072 bgcolor=#E9E9E9
| 152072 ||  || — || September 7, 2004 || Eskridge || Farpoint Obs. || — || align=right | 2.5 km || 
|-id=073 bgcolor=#d6d6d6
| 152073 ||  || — || September 8, 2004 || Socorro || LINEAR || — || align=right | 5.4 km || 
|-id=074 bgcolor=#d6d6d6
| 152074 ||  || — || September 6, 2004 || Siding Spring || SSS || EOS || align=right | 2.6 km || 
|-id=075 bgcolor=#E9E9E9
| 152075 ||  || — || September 6, 2004 || Siding Spring || SSS || — || align=right | 4.4 km || 
|-id=076 bgcolor=#E9E9E9
| 152076 ||  || — || September 7, 2004 || Kitt Peak || Spacewatch || HOF || align=right | 4.1 km || 
|-id=077 bgcolor=#E9E9E9
| 152077 ||  || — || September 7, 2004 || Kitt Peak || Spacewatch || — || align=right | 2.5 km || 
|-id=078 bgcolor=#d6d6d6
| 152078 ||  || — || September 7, 2004 || Socorro || LINEAR || EOS || align=right | 3.5 km || 
|-id=079 bgcolor=#E9E9E9
| 152079 ||  || — || September 7, 2004 || Kitt Peak || Spacewatch || — || align=right | 3.3 km || 
|-id=080 bgcolor=#d6d6d6
| 152080 ||  || — || September 7, 2004 || Kitt Peak || Spacewatch || 7:4* || align=right | 6.5 km || 
|-id=081 bgcolor=#d6d6d6
| 152081 ||  || — || September 6, 2004 || Palomar || NEAT || — || align=right | 5.5 km || 
|-id=082 bgcolor=#fefefe
| 152082 ||  || — || September 7, 2004 || Socorro || LINEAR || — || align=right | 1.5 km || 
|-id=083 bgcolor=#E9E9E9
| 152083 ||  || — || September 7, 2004 || Socorro || LINEAR || HOF || align=right | 4.5 km || 
|-id=084 bgcolor=#d6d6d6
| 152084 ||  || — || September 7, 2004 || Socorro || LINEAR || — || align=right | 4.9 km || 
|-id=085 bgcolor=#d6d6d6
| 152085 ||  || — || September 7, 2004 || Socorro || LINEAR || EOS || align=right | 4.6 km || 
|-id=086 bgcolor=#d6d6d6
| 152086 ||  || — || September 7, 2004 || Socorro || LINEAR || — || align=right | 4.6 km || 
|-id=087 bgcolor=#d6d6d6
| 152087 ||  || — || September 7, 2004 || Socorro || LINEAR || — || align=right | 5.1 km || 
|-id=088 bgcolor=#d6d6d6
| 152088 ||  || — || September 7, 2004 || Kitt Peak || Spacewatch || — || align=right | 3.3 km || 
|-id=089 bgcolor=#d6d6d6
| 152089 ||  || — || September 8, 2004 || Socorro || LINEAR || — || align=right | 4.1 km || 
|-id=090 bgcolor=#E9E9E9
| 152090 ||  || — || September 8, 2004 || Socorro || LINEAR || — || align=right | 4.3 km || 
|-id=091 bgcolor=#d6d6d6
| 152091 ||  || — || September 8, 2004 || Socorro || LINEAR || — || align=right | 3.1 km || 
|-id=092 bgcolor=#d6d6d6
| 152092 ||  || — || September 8, 2004 || Socorro || LINEAR || KOR || align=right | 2.2 km || 
|-id=093 bgcolor=#d6d6d6
| 152093 ||  || — || September 8, 2004 || Socorro || LINEAR || KOR || align=right | 2.4 km || 
|-id=094 bgcolor=#d6d6d6
| 152094 ||  || — || September 8, 2004 || Socorro || LINEAR || HIL3:2 || align=right | 10 km || 
|-id=095 bgcolor=#d6d6d6
| 152095 ||  || — || September 8, 2004 || Socorro || LINEAR || VER || align=right | 5.4 km || 
|-id=096 bgcolor=#d6d6d6
| 152096 ||  || — || September 8, 2004 || Socorro || LINEAR || — || align=right | 3.9 km || 
|-id=097 bgcolor=#d6d6d6
| 152097 ||  || — || September 8, 2004 || Socorro || LINEAR || — || align=right | 5.0 km || 
|-id=098 bgcolor=#d6d6d6
| 152098 ||  || — || September 8, 2004 || Socorro || LINEAR || — || align=right | 4.8 km || 
|-id=099 bgcolor=#d6d6d6
| 152099 ||  || — || September 8, 2004 || Socorro || LINEAR || — || align=right | 4.6 km || 
|-id=100 bgcolor=#d6d6d6
| 152100 ||  || — || September 8, 2004 || Socorro || LINEAR || HYG || align=right | 6.0 km || 
|}

152101–152200 

|-bgcolor=#E9E9E9
| 152101 ||  || — || September 8, 2004 || Socorro || LINEAR || — || align=right | 2.5 km || 
|-id=102 bgcolor=#d6d6d6
| 152102 ||  || — || September 9, 2004 || Socorro || LINEAR || HYG || align=right | 5.5 km || 
|-id=103 bgcolor=#d6d6d6
| 152103 ||  || — || September 8, 2004 || Socorro || LINEAR || — || align=right | 4.6 km || 
|-id=104 bgcolor=#d6d6d6
| 152104 ||  || — || September 7, 2004 || Kitt Peak || Spacewatch || — || align=right | 5.7 km || 
|-id=105 bgcolor=#d6d6d6
| 152105 ||  || — || September 7, 2004 || Kitt Peak || Spacewatch || — || align=right | 3.5 km || 
|-id=106 bgcolor=#E9E9E9
| 152106 ||  || — || September 9, 2004 || Socorro || LINEAR || — || align=right | 4.3 km || 
|-id=107 bgcolor=#fefefe
| 152107 ||  || — || September 9, 2004 || Socorro || LINEAR || — || align=right | 1.4 km || 
|-id=108 bgcolor=#d6d6d6
| 152108 ||  || — || September 10, 2004 || Socorro || LINEAR || EOS || align=right | 3.5 km || 
|-id=109 bgcolor=#d6d6d6
| 152109 ||  || — || September 10, 2004 || Socorro || LINEAR || — || align=right | 4.9 km || 
|-id=110 bgcolor=#d6d6d6
| 152110 ||  || — || September 8, 2004 || Palomar || NEAT || EOS || align=right | 3.6 km || 
|-id=111 bgcolor=#d6d6d6
| 152111 ||  || — || September 10, 2004 || Socorro || LINEAR || 7:4 || align=right | 7.7 km || 
|-id=112 bgcolor=#d6d6d6
| 152112 ||  || — || September 10, 2004 || Socorro || LINEAR || — || align=right | 6.1 km || 
|-id=113 bgcolor=#d6d6d6
| 152113 ||  || — || September 11, 2004 || Socorro || LINEAR || 7:4 || align=right | 7.7 km || 
|-id=114 bgcolor=#d6d6d6
| 152114 ||  || — || September 11, 2004 || Socorro || LINEAR || — || align=right | 5.5 km || 
|-id=115 bgcolor=#d6d6d6
| 152115 ||  || — || September 11, 2004 || Socorro || LINEAR || — || align=right | 5.9 km || 
|-id=116 bgcolor=#d6d6d6
| 152116 ||  || — || September 9, 2004 || Socorro || LINEAR || THM || align=right | 3.5 km || 
|-id=117 bgcolor=#d6d6d6
| 152117 ||  || — || September 10, 2004 || Kitt Peak || Spacewatch || — || align=right | 3.8 km || 
|-id=118 bgcolor=#d6d6d6
| 152118 ||  || — || September 6, 2004 || Palomar || NEAT || EOS || align=right | 3.5 km || 
|-id=119 bgcolor=#d6d6d6
| 152119 ||  || — || September 6, 2004 || Palomar || NEAT || — || align=right | 5.2 km || 
|-id=120 bgcolor=#E9E9E9
| 152120 ||  || — || September 13, 2004 || Kitt Peak || Spacewatch || — || align=right | 1.4 km || 
|-id=121 bgcolor=#d6d6d6
| 152121 ||  || — || September 15, 2004 || Kitt Peak || Spacewatch || THM || align=right | 3.7 km || 
|-id=122 bgcolor=#d6d6d6
| 152122 ||  || — || September 12, 2004 || Kitt Peak || Spacewatch || HIL3:2 || align=right | 8.9 km || 
|-id=123 bgcolor=#d6d6d6
| 152123 ||  || — || September 17, 2004 || Socorro || LINEAR || — || align=right | 3.7 km || 
|-id=124 bgcolor=#d6d6d6
| 152124 ||  || — || September 20, 2004 || Siding Spring || SSS || Tj (2.95) || align=right | 6.0 km || 
|-id=125 bgcolor=#d6d6d6
| 152125 ||  || — || September 17, 2004 || Socorro || LINEAR || — || align=right | 4.4 km || 
|-id=126 bgcolor=#d6d6d6
| 152126 ||  || — || September 16, 2004 || Anderson Mesa || LONEOS || BRA || align=right | 2.7 km || 
|-id=127 bgcolor=#d6d6d6
| 152127 ||  || — || October 4, 2004 || Kitt Peak || Spacewatch || YAK || align=right | 5.3 km || 
|-id=128 bgcolor=#d6d6d6
| 152128 ||  || — || October 5, 2004 || Kitt Peak || Spacewatch || — || align=right | 3.9 km || 
|-id=129 bgcolor=#d6d6d6
| 152129 ||  || — || October 5, 2004 || Kitt Peak || Spacewatch || — || align=right | 4.0 km || 
|-id=130 bgcolor=#E9E9E9
| 152130 ||  || — || October 5, 2004 || Palomar || NEAT || — || align=right | 4.7 km || 
|-id=131 bgcolor=#d6d6d6
| 152131 ||  || — || October 5, 2004 || Anderson Mesa || LONEOS || HYG || align=right | 5.2 km || 
|-id=132 bgcolor=#d6d6d6
| 152132 ||  || — || October 7, 2004 || Anderson Mesa || LONEOS || HIL3:2 || align=right | 11 km || 
|-id=133 bgcolor=#d6d6d6
| 152133 ||  || — || October 7, 2004 || Socorro || LINEAR || 3:2 || align=right | 8.2 km || 
|-id=134 bgcolor=#d6d6d6
| 152134 ||  || — || October 7, 2004 || Socorro || LINEAR || VER || align=right | 4.3 km || 
|-id=135 bgcolor=#d6d6d6
| 152135 ||  || — || October 4, 2004 || Kitt Peak || Spacewatch || — || align=right | 5.7 km || 
|-id=136 bgcolor=#d6d6d6
| 152136 ||  || — || October 7, 2004 || Kitt Peak || Spacewatch || — || align=right | 3.8 km || 
|-id=137 bgcolor=#d6d6d6
| 152137 ||  || — || October 12, 2004 || Anderson Mesa || LONEOS || — || align=right | 6.5 km || 
|-id=138 bgcolor=#d6d6d6
| 152138 ||  || — || October 10, 2004 || Kitt Peak || Spacewatch || — || align=right | 4.1 km || 
|-id=139 bgcolor=#d6d6d6
| 152139 ||  || — || October 10, 2004 || Kitt Peak || Spacewatch || — || align=right | 4.3 km || 
|-id=140 bgcolor=#d6d6d6
| 152140 ||  || — || October 18, 2004 || Socorro || LINEAR || — || align=right | 5.7 km || 
|-id=141 bgcolor=#d6d6d6
| 152141 ||  || — || November 6, 2004 || Socorro || LINEAR || ALA || align=right | 7.2 km || 
|-id=142 bgcolor=#E9E9E9
| 152142 || 2005 JT || — || May 3, 2005 || Socorro || LINEAR || — || align=right | 2.0 km || 
|-id=143 bgcolor=#fefefe
| 152143 ||  || — || May 4, 2005 || Anderson Mesa || LONEOS || MAS || align=right data-sort-value="0.96" | 960 m || 
|-id=144 bgcolor=#fefefe
| 152144 ||  || — || May 4, 2005 || Mount Lemmon || Mount Lemmon Survey || — || align=right | 1.3 km || 
|-id=145 bgcolor=#E9E9E9
| 152145 ||  || — || May 9, 2005 || Siding Spring || SSS || GER || align=right | 4.1 km || 
|-id=146 bgcolor=#fefefe
| 152146 Rosenlappin ||  ||  || June 9, 2005 || Jarnac || Jarnac Obs. || — || align=right | 1.1 km || 
|-id=147 bgcolor=#fefefe
| 152147 ||  || — || June 5, 2005 || Kitt Peak || Spacewatch || — || align=right | 1.5 km || 
|-id=148 bgcolor=#fefefe
| 152148 ||  || — || June 17, 2005 || Mount Lemmon || Mount Lemmon Survey || V || align=right | 1.1 km || 
|-id=149 bgcolor=#fefefe
| 152149 ||  || — || June 30, 2005 || Kitt Peak || Spacewatch || MAS || align=right | 1.2 km || 
|-id=150 bgcolor=#fefefe
| 152150 ||  || — || June 29, 2005 || Kitt Peak || Spacewatch || NYS || align=right data-sort-value="0.83" | 830 m || 
|-id=151 bgcolor=#fefefe
| 152151 ||  || — || June 30, 2005 || Kitt Peak || Spacewatch || MAS || align=right | 1.4 km || 
|-id=152 bgcolor=#E9E9E9
| 152152 ||  || — || June 30, 2005 || Palomar || NEAT || ADE || align=right | 3.0 km || 
|-id=153 bgcolor=#fefefe
| 152153 ||  || — || June 30, 2005 || Kitt Peak || Spacewatch || — || align=right | 1.4 km || 
|-id=154 bgcolor=#E9E9E9
| 152154 ||  || — || June 27, 2005 || Kitt Peak || Spacewatch || — || align=right | 2.8 km || 
|-id=155 bgcolor=#fefefe
| 152155 ||  || — || June 29, 2005 || Kitt Peak || Spacewatch || FLO || align=right data-sort-value="0.93" | 930 m || 
|-id=156 bgcolor=#d6d6d6
| 152156 ||  || — || June 30, 2005 || Kitt Peak || Spacewatch || — || align=right | 3.9 km || 
|-id=157 bgcolor=#fefefe
| 152157 ||  || — || July 3, 2005 || Mount Lemmon || Mount Lemmon Survey || — || align=right | 1.7 km || 
|-id=158 bgcolor=#E9E9E9
| 152158 ||  || — || July 5, 2005 || Kitt Peak || Spacewatch || — || align=right | 2.1 km || 
|-id=159 bgcolor=#E9E9E9
| 152159 ||  || — || July 10, 2005 || Siding Spring || SSS || — || align=right | 1.6 km || 
|-id=160 bgcolor=#fefefe
| 152160 ||  || — || July 3, 2005 || Catalina || CSS || — || align=right | 1.8 km || 
|-id=161 bgcolor=#d6d6d6
| 152161 ||  || — || July 7, 2005 || Kitt Peak || Spacewatch || — || align=right | 3.9 km || 
|-id=162 bgcolor=#fefefe
| 152162 ||  || — || July 7, 2005 || Anderson Mesa || LONEOS || — || align=right | 1.3 km || 
|-id=163 bgcolor=#fefefe
| 152163 ||  || — || July 8, 2005 || Anderson Mesa || LONEOS || — || align=right | 1.6 km || 
|-id=164 bgcolor=#fefefe
| 152164 ||  || — || July 2, 2005 || Catalina || CSS || — || align=right | 1.9 km || 
|-id=165 bgcolor=#fefefe
| 152165 || 2005 OF || — || July 17, 2005 || RAS || A. Lowe || — || align=right | 1.8 km || 
|-id=166 bgcolor=#d6d6d6
| 152166 ||  || — || July 26, 2005 || Palomar || NEAT || HYG || align=right | 4.1 km || 
|-id=167 bgcolor=#fefefe
| 152167 ||  || — || July 26, 2005 || Palomar || NEAT || V || align=right | 1.1 km || 
|-id=168 bgcolor=#E9E9E9
| 152168 ||  || — || July 27, 2005 || Palomar || NEAT || — || align=right | 1.7 km || 
|-id=169 bgcolor=#fefefe
| 152169 ||  || — || July 28, 2005 || Palomar || NEAT || NYS || align=right | 1.0 km || 
|-id=170 bgcolor=#fefefe
| 152170 ||  || — || July 29, 2005 || Palomar || NEAT || NYS || align=right | 2.2 km || 
|-id=171 bgcolor=#E9E9E9
| 152171 ||  || — || July 30, 2005 || Palomar || NEAT || — || align=right | 4.2 km || 
|-id=172 bgcolor=#fefefe
| 152172 ||  || — || July 31, 2005 || Siding Spring || SSS || — || align=right | 1.6 km || 
|-id=173 bgcolor=#fefefe
| 152173 ||  || — || July 28, 2005 || Palomar || NEAT || — || align=right | 1.7 km || 
|-id=174 bgcolor=#fefefe
| 152174 ||  || — || July 29, 2005 || Palomar || NEAT || MAS || align=right | 1.2 km || 
|-id=175 bgcolor=#fefefe
| 152175 ||  || — || July 29, 2005 || Anderson Mesa || LONEOS || — || align=right | 2.0 km || 
|-id=176 bgcolor=#E9E9E9
| 152176 ||  || — || August 6, 2005 || Siding Spring || SSS || — || align=right | 3.6 km || 
|-id=177 bgcolor=#E9E9E9
| 152177 ||  || — || August 4, 2005 || Palomar || NEAT || — || align=right | 1.4 km || 
|-id=178 bgcolor=#fefefe
| 152178 ||  || — || August 24, 2005 || Palomar || NEAT || NYS || align=right data-sort-value="0.91" | 910 m || 
|-id=179 bgcolor=#fefefe
| 152179 ||  || — || August 24, 2005 || Palomar || NEAT || NYS || align=right | 1.2 km || 
|-id=180 bgcolor=#d6d6d6
| 152180 ||  || — || August 25, 2005 || Palomar || NEAT || HYG || align=right | 4.7 km || 
|-id=181 bgcolor=#fefefe
| 152181 ||  || — || August 25, 2005 || Palomar || NEAT || — || align=right data-sort-value="0.98" | 980 m || 
|-id=182 bgcolor=#fefefe
| 152182 ||  || — || August 25, 2005 || Palomar || NEAT || — || align=right | 1.5 km || 
|-id=183 bgcolor=#fefefe
| 152183 ||  || — || August 25, 2005 || Palomar || NEAT || NYS || align=right | 1.0 km || 
|-id=184 bgcolor=#fefefe
| 152184 ||  || — || August 22, 2005 || Palomar || NEAT || — || align=right | 1.2 km || 
|-id=185 bgcolor=#fefefe
| 152185 ||  || — || August 25, 2005 || Palomar || NEAT || — || align=right | 1.1 km || 
|-id=186 bgcolor=#fefefe
| 152186 ||  || — || August 27, 2005 || Kitt Peak || Spacewatch || — || align=right | 1.4 km || 
|-id=187 bgcolor=#fefefe
| 152187 ||  || — || August 25, 2005 || Palomar || NEAT || NYS || align=right | 1.6 km || 
|-id=188 bgcolor=#E9E9E9
| 152188 Morricone ||  ||  || August 27, 2005 || CAOS || F. Mallia, A. Maury || — || align=right | 2.1 km || 
|-id=189 bgcolor=#fefefe
| 152189 ||  || — || August 28, 2005 || Kitt Peak || Spacewatch || MAS || align=right | 1.1 km || 
|-id=190 bgcolor=#E9E9E9
| 152190 ||  || — || August 29, 2005 || Vicques || M. Ory || — || align=right | 3.6 km || 
|-id=191 bgcolor=#fefefe
| 152191 ||  || — || August 25, 2005 || Palomar || NEAT || NYS || align=right | 1.3 km || 
|-id=192 bgcolor=#E9E9E9
| 152192 ||  || — || August 26, 2005 || Anderson Mesa || LONEOS || 526 || align=right | 3.3 km || 
|-id=193 bgcolor=#fefefe
| 152193 ||  || — || August 26, 2005 || Palomar || NEAT || V || align=right | 1.0 km || 
|-id=194 bgcolor=#d6d6d6
| 152194 ||  || — || August 26, 2005 || Palomar || NEAT || HYG || align=right | 3.8 km || 
|-id=195 bgcolor=#E9E9E9
| 152195 ||  || — || August 27, 2005 || Anderson Mesa || LONEOS || GEF || align=right | 2.0 km || 
|-id=196 bgcolor=#E9E9E9
| 152196 ||  || — || August 30, 2005 || Socorro || LINEAR || INO || align=right | 2.0 km || 
|-id=197 bgcolor=#E9E9E9
| 152197 ||  || — || August 30, 2005 || Anderson Mesa || LONEOS || — || align=right | 4.7 km || 
|-id=198 bgcolor=#E9E9E9
| 152198 ||  || — || August 27, 2005 || Palomar || NEAT || — || align=right | 3.3 km || 
|-id=199 bgcolor=#E9E9E9
| 152199 ||  || — || August 27, 2005 || Palomar || NEAT || — || align=right | 1.7 km || 
|-id=200 bgcolor=#fefefe
| 152200 ||  || — || August 27, 2005 || Palomar || NEAT || — || align=right | 1.0 km || 
|}

152201–152300 

|-bgcolor=#fefefe
| 152201 ||  || — || August 30, 2005 || Socorro || LINEAR || — || align=right | 1.5 km || 
|-id=202 bgcolor=#d6d6d6
| 152202 ||  || — || August 31, 2005 || Anderson Mesa || LONEOS || — || align=right | 3.9 km || 
|-id=203 bgcolor=#fefefe
| 152203 ||  || — || August 27, 2005 || Campo Imperatore || CINEOS || — || align=right | 1.3 km || 
|-id=204 bgcolor=#E9E9E9
| 152204 ||  || — || August 28, 2005 || Anderson Mesa || LONEOS || — || align=right | 2.3 km || 
|-id=205 bgcolor=#fefefe
| 152205 ||  || — || August 29, 2005 || Socorro || LINEAR || NYS || align=right | 1.5 km || 
|-id=206 bgcolor=#d6d6d6
| 152206 ||  || — || August 29, 2005 || Palomar || NEAT || — || align=right | 3.8 km || 
|-id=207 bgcolor=#E9E9E9
| 152207 ||  || — || August 29, 2005 || Palomar || NEAT || — || align=right | 3.7 km || 
|-id=208 bgcolor=#d6d6d6
| 152208 ||  || — || August 29, 2005 || Palomar || NEAT || HYG || align=right | 4.3 km || 
|-id=209 bgcolor=#fefefe
| 152209 ||  || — || August 29, 2005 || Palomar || NEAT || — || align=right | 2.6 km || 
|-id=210 bgcolor=#fefefe
| 152210 ||  || — || August 31, 2005 || Anderson Mesa || LONEOS || V || align=right | 1.1 km || 
|-id=211 bgcolor=#fefefe
| 152211 ||  || — || August 31, 2005 || Kitt Peak || Spacewatch || V || align=right | 1.2 km || 
|-id=212 bgcolor=#fefefe
| 152212 || 2005 RG || — || September 1, 2005 || Wrightwood || J. W. Young || V || align=right | 1.1 km || 
|-id=213 bgcolor=#E9E9E9
| 152213 ||  || — || September 6, 2005 || Anderson Mesa || LONEOS || — || align=right | 2.1 km || 
|-id=214 bgcolor=#fefefe
| 152214 ||  || — || September 2, 2005 || Palomar || NEAT || — || align=right | 3.7 km || 
|-id=215 bgcolor=#d6d6d6
| 152215 ||  || — || September 3, 2005 || Palomar || NEAT || — || align=right | 2.1 km || 
|-id=216 bgcolor=#E9E9E9
| 152216 ||  || — || September 3, 2005 || Palomar || NEAT || — || align=right | 1.3 km || 
|-id=217 bgcolor=#fefefe
| 152217 Akosipov ||  ||  || September 10, 2005 || Andrushivka || Andrushivka Obs. || — || align=right | 1.7 km || 
|-id=218 bgcolor=#d6d6d6
| 152218 ||  || — || September 10, 2005 || Anderson Mesa || LONEOS || — || align=right | 3.3 km || 
|-id=219 bgcolor=#fefefe
| 152219 ||  || — || September 10, 2005 || Anderson Mesa || LONEOS || V || align=right | 1.3 km || 
|-id=220 bgcolor=#E9E9E9
| 152220 ||  || — || September 10, 2005 || Anderson Mesa || LONEOS || — || align=right | 4.7 km || 
|-id=221 bgcolor=#fefefe
| 152221 ||  || — || September 10, 2005 || Anderson Mesa || LONEOS || V || align=right | 1.3 km || 
|-id=222 bgcolor=#d6d6d6
| 152222 ||  || — || September 12, 2005 || Socorro || LINEAR || EUP || align=right | 6.0 km || 
|-id=223 bgcolor=#d6d6d6
| 152223 ||  || — || September 14, 2005 || Catalina || CSS || — || align=right | 3.0 km || 
|-id=224 bgcolor=#E9E9E9
| 152224 || 2005 SJ || — || September 20, 2005 || Reedy Creek || J. Broughton || INO || align=right | 2.4 km || 
|-id=225 bgcolor=#d6d6d6
| 152225 ||  || — || September 23, 2005 || Catalina || CSS || — || align=right | 5.2 km || 
|-id=226 bgcolor=#d6d6d6
| 152226 Saracole ||  ||  || September 23, 2005 || Catalina || CSS || HYG || align=right | 4.3 km || 
|-id=227 bgcolor=#E9E9E9
| 152227 Argoli ||  ||  || September 24, 2005 || Vallemare di Borbona || V. S. Casulli || — || align=right | 2.0 km || 
|-id=228 bgcolor=#E9E9E9
| 152228 ||  || — || September 23, 2005 || Kitt Peak || Spacewatch || — || align=right | 6.2 km || 
|-id=229 bgcolor=#fefefe
| 152229 ||  || — || September 24, 2005 || Kitt Peak || Spacewatch || — || align=right | 2.9 km || 
|-id=230 bgcolor=#E9E9E9
| 152230 ||  || — || September 24, 2005 || Kitt Peak || Spacewatch || HEN || align=right | 1.6 km || 
|-id=231 bgcolor=#E9E9E9
| 152231 ||  || — || September 26, 2005 || Kitt Peak || Spacewatch || — || align=right | 2.6 km || 
|-id=232 bgcolor=#d6d6d6
| 152232 ||  || — || September 26, 2005 || Kitt Peak || Spacewatch || THM || align=right | 3.1 km || 
|-id=233 bgcolor=#d6d6d6
| 152233 Van Till ||  ||  || September 25, 2005 || Calvin-Rehoboth || Calvin–Rehoboth Obs. || THM || align=right | 3.1 km || 
|-id=234 bgcolor=#E9E9E9
| 152234 ||  || — || September 23, 2005 || Kitt Peak || Spacewatch || AGN || align=right | 1.7 km || 
|-id=235 bgcolor=#E9E9E9
| 152235 ||  || — || September 23, 2005 || Kitt Peak || Spacewatch || — || align=right | 2.5 km || 
|-id=236 bgcolor=#fefefe
| 152236 ||  || — || September 24, 2005 || Kitt Peak || Spacewatch || — || align=right | 2.3 km || 
|-id=237 bgcolor=#d6d6d6
| 152237 ||  || — || September 24, 2005 || Kitt Peak || Spacewatch || EOS || align=right | 3.3 km || 
|-id=238 bgcolor=#fefefe
| 152238 ||  || — || September 26, 2005 || Kitt Peak || Spacewatch || — || align=right | 2.1 km || 
|-id=239 bgcolor=#E9E9E9
| 152239 ||  || — || September 27, 2005 || Kitt Peak || Spacewatch || — || align=right | 3.5 km || 
|-id=240 bgcolor=#d6d6d6
| 152240 ||  || — || September 27, 2005 || Socorro || LINEAR || — || align=right | 6.3 km || 
|-id=241 bgcolor=#d6d6d6
| 152241 ||  || — || September 28, 2005 || Palomar || NEAT || — || align=right | 4.2 km || 
|-id=242 bgcolor=#E9E9E9
| 152242 ||  || — || September 28, 2005 || Palomar || NEAT || — || align=right | 2.1 km || 
|-id=243 bgcolor=#fefefe
| 152243 ||  || — || September 24, 2005 || Kitt Peak || Spacewatch || V || align=right data-sort-value="0.92" | 920 m || 
|-id=244 bgcolor=#fefefe
| 152244 ||  || — || September 24, 2005 || Goodricke-Pigott || R. A. Tucker || — || align=right | 1.5 km || 
|-id=245 bgcolor=#E9E9E9
| 152245 ||  || — || September 24, 2005 || Kitt Peak || Spacewatch || — || align=right | 3.1 km || 
|-id=246 bgcolor=#E9E9E9
| 152246 ||  || — || September 24, 2005 || Kitt Peak || Spacewatch || HEN || align=right | 1.8 km || 
|-id=247 bgcolor=#fefefe
| 152247 ||  || — || September 24, 2005 || Kitt Peak || Spacewatch || NYS || align=right | 1.2 km || 
|-id=248 bgcolor=#fefefe
| 152248 ||  || — || September 24, 2005 || Kitt Peak || Spacewatch || — || align=right data-sort-value="0.94" | 940 m || 
|-id=249 bgcolor=#E9E9E9
| 152249 ||  || — || September 25, 2005 || Palomar || NEAT || MAR || align=right | 1.6 km || 
|-id=250 bgcolor=#fefefe
| 152250 ||  || — || September 25, 2005 || Kitt Peak || Spacewatch || — || align=right | 1.1 km || 
|-id=251 bgcolor=#fefefe
| 152251 ||  || — || September 25, 2005 || Kitt Peak || Spacewatch || — || align=right | 1.1 km || 
|-id=252 bgcolor=#E9E9E9
| 152252 ||  || — || September 25, 2005 || Kitt Peak || Spacewatch || — || align=right | 1.3 km || 
|-id=253 bgcolor=#fefefe
| 152253 ||  || — || September 27, 2005 || Kitt Peak || Spacewatch || — || align=right | 1.4 km || 
|-id=254 bgcolor=#d6d6d6
| 152254 ||  || — || September 27, 2005 || Kitt Peak || Spacewatch || KOR || align=right | 1.7 km || 
|-id=255 bgcolor=#E9E9E9
| 152255 ||  || — || September 28, 2005 || Palomar || NEAT || — || align=right | 3.9 km || 
|-id=256 bgcolor=#d6d6d6
| 152256 ||  || — || September 29, 2005 || Anderson Mesa || LONEOS || — || align=right | 3.9 km || 
|-id=257 bgcolor=#d6d6d6
| 152257 ||  || — || September 29, 2005 || Mount Lemmon || Mount Lemmon Survey || KOR || align=right | 2.0 km || 
|-id=258 bgcolor=#fefefe
| 152258 ||  || — || September 29, 2005 || Anderson Mesa || LONEOS || FLO || align=right data-sort-value="0.95" | 950 m || 
|-id=259 bgcolor=#d6d6d6
| 152259 ||  || — || September 29, 2005 || Goodricke-Pigott || R. A. Tucker || — || align=right | 3.3 km || 
|-id=260 bgcolor=#d6d6d6
| 152260 ||  || — || September 25, 2005 || Kitt Peak || Spacewatch || HYG || align=right | 3.7 km || 
|-id=261 bgcolor=#fefefe
| 152261 ||  || — || September 25, 2005 || Kitt Peak || Spacewatch || — || align=right | 1.0 km || 
|-id=262 bgcolor=#d6d6d6
| 152262 ||  || — || September 25, 2005 || Kitt Peak || Spacewatch || EOS || align=right | 3.6 km || 
|-id=263 bgcolor=#E9E9E9
| 152263 ||  || — || September 27, 2005 || Kitt Peak || Spacewatch || — || align=right | 2.8 km || 
|-id=264 bgcolor=#E9E9E9
| 152264 ||  || — || September 28, 2005 || Palomar || NEAT || — || align=right | 3.9 km || 
|-id=265 bgcolor=#fefefe
| 152265 ||  || — || September 29, 2005 || Palomar || NEAT || — || align=right | 1.5 km || 
|-id=266 bgcolor=#fefefe
| 152266 ||  || — || September 29, 2005 || Palomar || NEAT || NYS || align=right data-sort-value="0.91" | 910 m || 
|-id=267 bgcolor=#fefefe
| 152267 ||  || — || September 29, 2005 || Anderson Mesa || LONEOS || — || align=right | 2.7 km || 
|-id=268 bgcolor=#d6d6d6
| 152268 ||  || — || September 29, 2005 || Kitt Peak || Spacewatch || — || align=right | 4.4 km || 
|-id=269 bgcolor=#d6d6d6
| 152269 ||  || — || September 30, 2005 || Mount Lemmon || Mount Lemmon Survey || — || align=right | 4.0 km || 
|-id=270 bgcolor=#d6d6d6
| 152270 ||  || — || September 30, 2005 || Socorro || LINEAR || — || align=right | 5.0 km || 
|-id=271 bgcolor=#d6d6d6
| 152271 ||  || — || September 30, 2005 || Kitt Peak || Spacewatch || — || align=right | 3.3 km || 
|-id=272 bgcolor=#E9E9E9
| 152272 ||  || — || September 30, 2005 || Mount Lemmon || Mount Lemmon Survey || ADE || align=right | 5.1 km || 
|-id=273 bgcolor=#E9E9E9
| 152273 ||  || — || September 29, 2005 || Catalina || CSS || MAR || align=right | 2.4 km || 
|-id=274 bgcolor=#E9E9E9
| 152274 ||  || — || September 30, 2005 || Socorro || LINEAR || — || align=right | 3.8 km || 
|-id=275 bgcolor=#E9E9E9
| 152275 ||  || — || September 30, 2005 || Mount Lemmon || Mount Lemmon Survey || HEN || align=right | 1.2 km || 
|-id=276 bgcolor=#fefefe
| 152276 ||  || — || September 29, 2005 || Mount Lemmon || Mount Lemmon Survey || — || align=right data-sort-value="0.97" | 970 m || 
|-id=277 bgcolor=#d6d6d6
| 152277 ||  || — || September 29, 2005 || Kitt Peak || Spacewatch || — || align=right | 6.1 km || 
|-id=278 bgcolor=#fefefe
| 152278 ||  || — || September 22, 2005 || Palomar || NEAT || — || align=right | 1.3 km || 
|-id=279 bgcolor=#E9E9E9
| 152279 ||  || — || September 23, 2005 || Kitt Peak || Spacewatch || — || align=right | 1.7 km || 
|-id=280 bgcolor=#E9E9E9
| 152280 ||  || — || October 1, 2005 || Catalina || CSS || MAR || align=right | 2.2 km || 
|-id=281 bgcolor=#E9E9E9
| 152281 ||  || — || October 1, 2005 || Catalina || CSS || — || align=right | 3.9 km || 
|-id=282 bgcolor=#E9E9E9
| 152282 ||  || — || October 1, 2005 || Catalina || CSS || — || align=right | 3.8 km || 
|-id=283 bgcolor=#d6d6d6
| 152283 ||  || — || October 1, 2005 || Catalina || CSS || — || align=right | 4.5 km || 
|-id=284 bgcolor=#E9E9E9
| 152284 ||  || — || October 1, 2005 || Kitt Peak || Spacewatch || — || align=right | 2.9 km || 
|-id=285 bgcolor=#d6d6d6
| 152285 ||  || — || October 2, 2005 || Palomar || NEAT || — || align=right | 4.3 km || 
|-id=286 bgcolor=#d6d6d6
| 152286 ||  || — || October 2, 2005 || Palomar || NEAT || AEG || align=right | 5.2 km || 
|-id=287 bgcolor=#d6d6d6
| 152287 ||  || — || October 1, 2005 || Socorro || LINEAR || — || align=right | 4.7 km || 
|-id=288 bgcolor=#E9E9E9
| 152288 ||  || — || October 1, 2005 || Anderson Mesa || LONEOS || MRX || align=right | 1.8 km || 
|-id=289 bgcolor=#d6d6d6
| 152289 ||  || — || October 1, 2005 || Socorro || LINEAR || — || align=right | 4.1 km || 
|-id=290 bgcolor=#E9E9E9
| 152290 Lorettaoberheim ||  ||  || October 1, 2005 || Catalina || R. A. Kowalski || NEM || align=right | 3.2 km || 
|-id=291 bgcolor=#d6d6d6
| 152291 ||  || — || October 1, 2005 || Mount Lemmon || Mount Lemmon Survey || — || align=right | 4.9 km || 
|-id=292 bgcolor=#d6d6d6
| 152292 ||  || — || October 1, 2005 || Anderson Mesa || LONEOS || — || align=right | 5.1 km || 
|-id=293 bgcolor=#d6d6d6
| 152293 ||  || — || October 1, 2005 || Anderson Mesa || LONEOS || — || align=right | 7.3 km || 
|-id=294 bgcolor=#E9E9E9
| 152294 ||  || — || October 1, 2005 || Mount Lemmon || Mount Lemmon Survey || — || align=right | 3.8 km || 
|-id=295 bgcolor=#fefefe
| 152295 ||  || — || October 4, 2005 || Catalina || CSS || — || align=right | 1.6 km || 
|-id=296 bgcolor=#d6d6d6
| 152296 ||  || — || October 3, 2005 || Bergisch Gladbach || W. Bickel || — || align=right | 4.7 km || 
|-id=297 bgcolor=#C2FFFF
| 152297 ||  || — || October 6, 2005 || Mount Lemmon || Mount Lemmon Survey || L5 || align=right | 14 km || 
|-id=298 bgcolor=#E9E9E9
| 152298 ||  || — || October 9, 2005 || Great Shefford || Great Shefford Obs. || — || align=right | 1.5 km || 
|-id=299 bgcolor=#fefefe
| 152299 Vanautgaerden ||  ||  || October 11, 2005 || Uccle || P. De Cat || V || align=right | 1.1 km || 
|-id=300 bgcolor=#fefefe
| 152300 ||  || — || October 11, 2005 || Uccle || T. Pauwels || — || align=right | 1.7 km || 
|}

152301–152400 

|-bgcolor=#fefefe
| 152301 ||  || — || October 1, 2005 || Mount Lemmon || Mount Lemmon Survey || — || align=right | 1.6 km || 
|-id=302 bgcolor=#E9E9E9
| 152302 ||  || — || October 5, 2005 || Catalina || CSS || — || align=right | 4.3 km || 
|-id=303 bgcolor=#d6d6d6
| 152303 ||  || — || October 5, 2005 || Catalina || CSS || — || align=right | 5.5 km || 
|-id=304 bgcolor=#d6d6d6
| 152304 ||  || — || October 6, 2005 || Catalina || CSS || — || align=right | 5.0 km || 
|-id=305 bgcolor=#E9E9E9
| 152305 ||  || — || October 6, 2005 || Catalina || CSS || ADE || align=right | 3.9 km || 
|-id=306 bgcolor=#E9E9E9
| 152306 ||  || — || October 7, 2005 || Anderson Mesa || LONEOS || — || align=right | 3.0 km || 
|-id=307 bgcolor=#d6d6d6
| 152307 ||  || — || October 7, 2005 || Anderson Mesa || LONEOS || — || align=right | 7.2 km || 
|-id=308 bgcolor=#d6d6d6
| 152308 ||  || — || October 1, 2005 || Catalina || CSS || — || align=right | 4.3 km || 
|-id=309 bgcolor=#E9E9E9
| 152309 ||  || — || October 6, 2005 || Catalina || CSS || — || align=right | 1.7 km || 
|-id=310 bgcolor=#fefefe
| 152310 ||  || — || October 7, 2005 || Kitt Peak || Spacewatch || V || align=right data-sort-value="0.78" | 780 m || 
|-id=311 bgcolor=#E9E9E9
| 152311 ||  || — || October 7, 2005 || Kitt Peak || Spacewatch || — || align=right | 1.7 km || 
|-id=312 bgcolor=#E9E9E9
| 152312 ||  || — || October 8, 2005 || Kitt Peak || Spacewatch || — || align=right | 1.3 km || 
|-id=313 bgcolor=#fefefe
| 152313 ||  || — || October 8, 2005 || Kitt Peak || Spacewatch || FLO || align=right | 1.1 km || 
|-id=314 bgcolor=#E9E9E9
| 152314 ||  || — || October 7, 2005 || Catalina || CSS || — || align=right | 2.9 km || 
|-id=315 bgcolor=#fefefe
| 152315 ||  || — || October 9, 2005 || Kitt Peak || Spacewatch || — || align=right | 1.0 km || 
|-id=316 bgcolor=#fefefe
| 152316 ||  || — || October 11, 2005 || Anderson Mesa || LONEOS || LCI || align=right | 1.8 km || 
|-id=317 bgcolor=#d6d6d6
| 152317 ||  || — || October 1, 2005 || Anderson Mesa || LONEOS || — || align=right | 5.1 km || 
|-id=318 bgcolor=#d6d6d6
| 152318 ||  || — || October 7, 2005 || Anderson Mesa || LONEOS || — || align=right | 5.4 km || 
|-id=319 bgcolor=#E9E9E9
| 152319 Pynchon ||  ||  || October 29, 2005 || RAS || E. Guido || — || align=right | 1.8 km || 
|-id=320 bgcolor=#d6d6d6
| 152320 Lichtenknecker ||  ||  || October 27, 2005 || Ottmarsheim || C. Rinner || — || align=right | 5.1 km || 
|-id=321 bgcolor=#fefefe
| 152321 ||  || — || October 20, 2005 || Palomar || NEAT || V || align=right | 1.2 km || 
|-id=322 bgcolor=#d6d6d6
| 152322 ||  || — || October 21, 2005 || Palomar || NEAT || EOS || align=right | 2.8 km || 
|-id=323 bgcolor=#d6d6d6
| 152323 ||  || — || October 22, 2005 || Kitt Peak || Spacewatch || EOS || align=right | 3.7 km || 
|-id=324 bgcolor=#E9E9E9
| 152324 ||  || — || October 22, 2005 || Kitt Peak || Spacewatch || — || align=right | 3.3 km || 
|-id=325 bgcolor=#E9E9E9
| 152325 ||  || — || October 22, 2005 || Kitt Peak || Spacewatch || — || align=right | 2.8 km || 
|-id=326 bgcolor=#fefefe
| 152326 ||  || — || October 22, 2005 || Catalina || CSS || — || align=right | 2.7 km || 
|-id=327 bgcolor=#d6d6d6
| 152327 ||  || — || October 22, 2005 || Kitt Peak || Spacewatch || URS || align=right | 7.0 km || 
|-id=328 bgcolor=#d6d6d6
| 152328 ||  || — || October 22, 2005 || Catalina || CSS || 3:2 || align=right | 7.0 km || 
|-id=329 bgcolor=#E9E9E9
| 152329 ||  || — || October 23, 2005 || Kitt Peak || Spacewatch || HOF || align=right | 4.6 km || 
|-id=330 bgcolor=#E9E9E9
| 152330 ||  || — || October 23, 2005 || Catalina || CSS || — || align=right | 2.7 km || 
|-id=331 bgcolor=#d6d6d6
| 152331 ||  || — || October 23, 2005 || Catalina || CSS || 7:4 || align=right | 6.8 km || 
|-id=332 bgcolor=#d6d6d6
| 152332 ||  || — || October 23, 2005 || Catalina || CSS || — || align=right | 6.1 km || 
|-id=333 bgcolor=#E9E9E9
| 152333 ||  || — || October 24, 2005 || Kitt Peak || Spacewatch || — || align=right | 3.8 km || 
|-id=334 bgcolor=#d6d6d6
| 152334 ||  || — || October 24, 2005 || Kitt Peak || Spacewatch || — || align=right | 4.5 km || 
|-id=335 bgcolor=#d6d6d6
| 152335 ||  || — || October 22, 2005 || Kitt Peak || Spacewatch || — || align=right | 5.7 km || 
|-id=336 bgcolor=#d6d6d6
| 152336 ||  || — || October 23, 2005 || Catalina || CSS || — || align=right | 7.8 km || 
|-id=337 bgcolor=#d6d6d6
| 152337 ||  || — || October 23, 2005 || Catalina || CSS || THM || align=right | 3.4 km || 
|-id=338 bgcolor=#d6d6d6
| 152338 ||  || — || October 25, 2005 || Catalina || CSS || — || align=right | 4.7 km || 
|-id=339 bgcolor=#E9E9E9
| 152339 ||  || — || October 25, 2005 || Mount Lemmon || Mount Lemmon Survey || — || align=right | 3.7 km || 
|-id=340 bgcolor=#E9E9E9
| 152340 ||  || — || October 25, 2005 || Mount Lemmon || Mount Lemmon Survey || — || align=right | 2.1 km || 
|-id=341 bgcolor=#d6d6d6
| 152341 ||  || — || October 22, 2005 || Catalina || CSS || SAN || align=right | 2.5 km || 
|-id=342 bgcolor=#d6d6d6
| 152342 ||  || — || October 23, 2005 || Palomar || NEAT || KOR || align=right | 2.5 km || 
|-id=343 bgcolor=#E9E9E9
| 152343 ||  || — || October 23, 2005 || Palomar || NEAT || NEM || align=right | 4.4 km || 
|-id=344 bgcolor=#E9E9E9
| 152344 ||  || — || October 24, 2005 || Palomar || NEAT || — || align=right | 2.1 km || 
|-id=345 bgcolor=#E9E9E9
| 152345 ||  || — || October 25, 2005 || Catalina || CSS || — || align=right | 3.0 km || 
|-id=346 bgcolor=#E9E9E9
| 152346 ||  || — || October 25, 2005 || Kitt Peak || Spacewatch || — || align=right | 2.9 km || 
|-id=347 bgcolor=#E9E9E9
| 152347 ||  || — || October 22, 2005 || Kitt Peak || Spacewatch || — || align=right | 2.2 km || 
|-id=348 bgcolor=#fefefe
| 152348 ||  || — || October 22, 2005 || Kitt Peak || Spacewatch || MAS || align=right | 1.1 km || 
|-id=349 bgcolor=#d6d6d6
| 152349 ||  || — || October 22, 2005 || Kitt Peak || Spacewatch || — || align=right | 2.2 km || 
|-id=350 bgcolor=#E9E9E9
| 152350 ||  || — || October 22, 2005 || Kitt Peak || Spacewatch || AST || align=right | 2.3 km || 
|-id=351 bgcolor=#E9E9E9
| 152351 ||  || — || October 22, 2005 || Kitt Peak || Spacewatch || — || align=right | 2.3 km || 
|-id=352 bgcolor=#E9E9E9
| 152352 ||  || — || October 22, 2005 || Kitt Peak || Spacewatch || — || align=right | 4.3 km || 
|-id=353 bgcolor=#d6d6d6
| 152353 ||  || — || October 22, 2005 || Palomar || NEAT || — || align=right | 5.8 km || 
|-id=354 bgcolor=#E9E9E9
| 152354 ||  || — || October 23, 2005 || Catalina || CSS || — || align=right | 2.5 km || 
|-id=355 bgcolor=#d6d6d6
| 152355 ||  || — || October 23, 2005 || Kitt Peak || Spacewatch || KOR || align=right | 1.9 km || 
|-id=356 bgcolor=#E9E9E9
| 152356 ||  || — || October 24, 2005 || Kitt Peak || Spacewatch || — || align=right | 2.2 km || 
|-id=357 bgcolor=#fefefe
| 152357 ||  || — || October 24, 2005 || Kitt Peak || Spacewatch || NYS || align=right | 1.1 km || 
|-id=358 bgcolor=#E9E9E9
| 152358 ||  || — || October 24, 2005 || Kitt Peak || Spacewatch || HEN || align=right | 1.6 km || 
|-id=359 bgcolor=#d6d6d6
| 152359 ||  || — || October 24, 2005 || Kitt Peak || Spacewatch || — || align=right | 3.7 km || 
|-id=360 bgcolor=#d6d6d6
| 152360 ||  || — || October 24, 2005 || Palomar || NEAT || — || align=right | 5.3 km || 
|-id=361 bgcolor=#d6d6d6
| 152361 ||  || — || October 25, 2005 || Mount Lemmon || Mount Lemmon Survey || — || align=right | 4.1 km || 
|-id=362 bgcolor=#d6d6d6
| 152362 ||  || — || October 25, 2005 || Catalina || CSS || — || align=right | 4.9 km || 
|-id=363 bgcolor=#d6d6d6
| 152363 ||  || — || October 25, 2005 || Catalina || CSS || — || align=right | 4.4 km || 
|-id=364 bgcolor=#d6d6d6
| 152364 ||  || — || October 25, 2005 || Catalina || CSS || — || align=right | 4.8 km || 
|-id=365 bgcolor=#E9E9E9
| 152365 ||  || — || October 25, 2005 || Catalina || CSS || — || align=right | 4.7 km || 
|-id=366 bgcolor=#d6d6d6
| 152366 ||  || — || October 26, 2005 || Kitt Peak || Spacewatch || — || align=right | 4.0 km || 
|-id=367 bgcolor=#E9E9E9
| 152367 ||  || — || October 26, 2005 || Anderson Mesa || LONEOS || — || align=right | 4.4 km || 
|-id=368 bgcolor=#d6d6d6
| 152368 ||  || — || October 28, 2005 || Goodricke-Pigott || R. A. Tucker || — || align=right | 5.1 km || 
|-id=369 bgcolor=#E9E9E9
| 152369 ||  || — || October 21, 2005 || Palomar || NEAT || AGN || align=right | 1.8 km || 
|-id=370 bgcolor=#d6d6d6
| 152370 ||  || — || October 22, 2005 || Catalina || CSS || — || align=right | 3.7 km || 
|-id=371 bgcolor=#d6d6d6
| 152371 ||  || — || October 27, 2005 || Anderson Mesa || LONEOS || — || align=right | 4.7 km || 
|-id=372 bgcolor=#E9E9E9
| 152372 ||  || — || October 24, 2005 || Kitt Peak || Spacewatch || HEN || align=right | 1.7 km || 
|-id=373 bgcolor=#d6d6d6
| 152373 ||  || — || October 24, 2005 || Kitt Peak || Spacewatch || 3:2 || align=right | 5.3 km || 
|-id=374 bgcolor=#E9E9E9
| 152374 ||  || — || October 24, 2005 || Kitt Peak || Spacewatch || — || align=right | 1.3 km || 
|-id=375 bgcolor=#d6d6d6
| 152375 ||  || — || October 24, 2005 || Kitt Peak || Spacewatch || KOR || align=right | 1.7 km || 
|-id=376 bgcolor=#d6d6d6
| 152376 ||  || — || October 24, 2005 || Kitt Peak || Spacewatch || HYG || align=right | 4.5 km || 
|-id=377 bgcolor=#d6d6d6
| 152377 ||  || — || October 24, 2005 || Kitt Peak || Spacewatch || — || align=right | 3.0 km || 
|-id=378 bgcolor=#E9E9E9
| 152378 ||  || — || October 25, 2005 || Mount Lemmon || Mount Lemmon Survey || — || align=right | 3.0 km || 
|-id=379 bgcolor=#E9E9E9
| 152379 ||  || — || October 25, 2005 || Mount Lemmon || Mount Lemmon Survey || AST || align=right | 2.6 km || 
|-id=380 bgcolor=#E9E9E9
| 152380 ||  || — || October 25, 2005 || Kitt Peak || Spacewatch || HEN || align=right | 1.8 km || 
|-id=381 bgcolor=#E9E9E9
| 152381 ||  || — || October 26, 2005 || Kitt Peak || Spacewatch || — || align=right | 2.4 km || 
|-id=382 bgcolor=#d6d6d6
| 152382 ||  || — || October 26, 2005 || Kitt Peak || Spacewatch || — || align=right | 2.4 km || 
|-id=383 bgcolor=#E9E9E9
| 152383 ||  || — || October 26, 2005 || Kitt Peak || Spacewatch || — || align=right | 3.2 km || 
|-id=384 bgcolor=#E9E9E9
| 152384 ||  || — || October 27, 2005 || Kitt Peak || Spacewatch || — || align=right | 3.1 km || 
|-id=385 bgcolor=#E9E9E9
| 152385 ||  || — || October 25, 2005 || Kitt Peak || Spacewatch || — || align=right | 3.9 km || 
|-id=386 bgcolor=#d6d6d6
| 152386 ||  || — || October 27, 2005 || Kitt Peak || Spacewatch || THM || align=right | 3.2 km || 
|-id=387 bgcolor=#d6d6d6
| 152387 ||  || — || October 25, 2005 || Kitt Peak || Spacewatch || — || align=right | 3.3 km || 
|-id=388 bgcolor=#E9E9E9
| 152388 ||  || — || October 25, 2005 || Kitt Peak || Spacewatch || — || align=right | 3.0 km || 
|-id=389 bgcolor=#E9E9E9
| 152389 ||  || — || October 25, 2005 || Kitt Peak || Spacewatch || — || align=right | 1.4 km || 
|-id=390 bgcolor=#E9E9E9
| 152390 ||  || — || October 25, 2005 || Kitt Peak || Spacewatch || — || align=right | 1.9 km || 
|-id=391 bgcolor=#d6d6d6
| 152391 ||  || — || October 25, 2005 || Kitt Peak || Spacewatch || HYG || align=right | 5.4 km || 
|-id=392 bgcolor=#fefefe
| 152392 ||  || — || October 25, 2005 || Kitt Peak || Spacewatch || — || align=right | 4.1 km || 
|-id=393 bgcolor=#d6d6d6
| 152393 ||  || — || October 25, 2005 || Kitt Peak || Spacewatch || EOS || align=right | 3.1 km || 
|-id=394 bgcolor=#d6d6d6
| 152394 ||  || — || October 23, 2005 || Catalina || CSS || EOS || align=right | 2.8 km || 
|-id=395 bgcolor=#E9E9E9
| 152395 ||  || — || October 27, 2005 || Kitt Peak || Spacewatch || — || align=right | 2.2 km || 
|-id=396 bgcolor=#d6d6d6
| 152396 ||  || — || October 28, 2005 || Socorro || LINEAR || — || align=right | 3.2 km || 
|-id=397 bgcolor=#d6d6d6
| 152397 ||  || — || October 28, 2005 || Socorro || LINEAR || — || align=right | 4.6 km || 
|-id=398 bgcolor=#E9E9E9
| 152398 ||  || — || October 26, 2005 || Kitt Peak || Spacewatch || MRX || align=right | 1.8 km || 
|-id=399 bgcolor=#d6d6d6
| 152399 ||  || — || October 26, 2005 || Kitt Peak || Spacewatch || KOR || align=right | 1.8 km || 
|-id=400 bgcolor=#E9E9E9
| 152400 ||  || — || October 26, 2005 || Kitt Peak || Spacewatch || — || align=right | 2.5 km || 
|}

152401–152500 

|-bgcolor=#d6d6d6
| 152401 ||  || — || October 26, 2005 || Kitt Peak || Spacewatch || — || align=right | 3.6 km || 
|-id=402 bgcolor=#E9E9E9
| 152402 ||  || — || October 26, 2005 || Kitt Peak || Spacewatch || — || align=right | 3.0 km || 
|-id=403 bgcolor=#E9E9E9
| 152403 ||  || — || October 27, 2005 || Mount Lemmon || Mount Lemmon Survey || — || align=right | 2.9 km || 
|-id=404 bgcolor=#d6d6d6
| 152404 ||  || — || October 29, 2005 || Catalina || CSS || EOS || align=right | 5.7 km || 
|-id=405 bgcolor=#E9E9E9
| 152405 ||  || — || October 25, 2005 || Mount Lemmon || Mount Lemmon Survey || — || align=right | 1.5 km || 
|-id=406 bgcolor=#E9E9E9
| 152406 ||  || — || October 27, 2005 || Kitt Peak || Spacewatch || — || align=right | 2.0 km || 
|-id=407 bgcolor=#E9E9E9
| 152407 ||  || — || October 27, 2005 || Kitt Peak || Spacewatch || AGN || align=right | 1.8 km || 
|-id=408 bgcolor=#d6d6d6
| 152408 ||  || — || October 28, 2005 || Catalina || CSS || — || align=right | 4.5 km || 
|-id=409 bgcolor=#d6d6d6
| 152409 ||  || — || October 28, 2005 || Socorro || LINEAR || — || align=right | 5.6 km || 
|-id=410 bgcolor=#d6d6d6
| 152410 ||  || — || October 29, 2005 || Mount Lemmon || Mount Lemmon Survey || — || align=right | 3.5 km || 
|-id=411 bgcolor=#d6d6d6
| 152411 ||  || — || October 31, 2005 || Kitt Peak || Spacewatch || — || align=right | 3.7 km || 
|-id=412 bgcolor=#E9E9E9
| 152412 ||  || — || October 31, 2005 || Catalina || CSS || — || align=right | 5.5 km || 
|-id=413 bgcolor=#E9E9E9
| 152413 ||  || — || October 29, 2005 || Mount Lemmon || Mount Lemmon Survey || AGN || align=right | 1.9 km || 
|-id=414 bgcolor=#d6d6d6
| 152414 ||  || — || October 27, 2005 || Palomar || NEAT || — || align=right | 7.2 km || 
|-id=415 bgcolor=#d6d6d6
| 152415 ||  || — || October 31, 2005 || Mount Lemmon || Mount Lemmon Survey || — || align=right | 3.7 km || 
|-id=416 bgcolor=#fefefe
| 152416 ||  || — || October 27, 2005 || Kitt Peak || Spacewatch || — || align=right | 1.4 km || 
|-id=417 bgcolor=#fefefe
| 152417 ||  || — || October 27, 2005 || Kitt Peak || Spacewatch || — || align=right data-sort-value="0.98" | 980 m || 
|-id=418 bgcolor=#d6d6d6
| 152418 ||  || — || October 25, 2005 || Socorro || LINEAR || — || align=right | 5.5 km || 
|-id=419 bgcolor=#d6d6d6
| 152419 ||  || — || October 26, 2005 || Socorro || LINEAR || — || align=right | 5.6 km || 
|-id=420 bgcolor=#d6d6d6
| 152420 ||  || — || October 27, 2005 || Socorro || LINEAR || EUP || align=right | 9.0 km || 
|-id=421 bgcolor=#E9E9E9
| 152421 ||  || — || October 27, 2005 || Catalina || CSS || MAR || align=right | 1.8 km || 
|-id=422 bgcolor=#E9E9E9
| 152422 ||  || — || October 30, 2005 || Socorro || LINEAR || GEF || align=right | 2.0 km || 
|-id=423 bgcolor=#E9E9E9
| 152423 ||  || — || October 30, 2005 || Catalina || CSS || — || align=right | 2.8 km || 
|-id=424 bgcolor=#d6d6d6
| 152424 ||  || — || October 27, 2005 || Anderson Mesa || LONEOS || — || align=right | 6.8 km || 
|-id=425 bgcolor=#E9E9E9
| 152425 ||  || — || October 26, 2005 || Palomar || NEAT || — || align=right | 3.0 km || 
|-id=426 bgcolor=#d6d6d6
| 152426 ||  || — || October 27, 2005 || Catalina || CSS || — || align=right | 3.8 km || 
|-id=427 bgcolor=#E9E9E9
| 152427 ||  || — || October 28, 2005 || Socorro || LINEAR || MAR || align=right | 2.0 km || 
|-id=428 bgcolor=#d6d6d6
| 152428 ||  || — || October 30, 2005 || Catalina || CSS || — || align=right | 4.9 km || 
|-id=429 bgcolor=#E9E9E9
| 152429 ||  || — || October 30, 2005 || Kitt Peak || Spacewatch || — || align=right | 2.2 km || 
|-id=430 bgcolor=#d6d6d6
| 152430 ||  || — || October 30, 2005 || Mount Lemmon || Mount Lemmon Survey || KAR || align=right | 1.4 km || 
|-id=431 bgcolor=#E9E9E9
| 152431 ||  || — || October 31, 2005 || Mount Lemmon || Mount Lemmon Survey || MIS || align=right | 4.2 km || 
|-id=432 bgcolor=#d6d6d6
| 152432 ||  || — || October 25, 2005 || Kitt Peak || Spacewatch || THM || align=right | 4.4 km || 
|-id=433 bgcolor=#fefefe
| 152433 ||  || — || October 28, 2005 || Kitt Peak || Spacewatch || MAS || align=right data-sort-value="0.96" | 960 m || 
|-id=434 bgcolor=#d6d6d6
| 152434 ||  || — || October 28, 2005 || Kitt Peak || Spacewatch || slow || align=right | 5.1 km || 
|-id=435 bgcolor=#d6d6d6
| 152435 ||  || — || October 29, 2005 || Catalina || CSS || — || align=right | 5.6 km || 
|-id=436 bgcolor=#d6d6d6
| 152436 ||  || — || October 29, 2005 || Catalina || CSS || — || align=right | 5.6 km || 
|-id=437 bgcolor=#E9E9E9
| 152437 ||  || — || October 29, 2005 || Palomar || NEAT || — || align=right | 2.9 km || 
|-id=438 bgcolor=#E9E9E9
| 152438 ||  || — || October 29, 2005 || Palomar || NEAT || — || align=right | 3.9 km || 
|-id=439 bgcolor=#d6d6d6
| 152439 ||  || — || October 29, 2005 || Catalina || CSS || NAE || align=right | 5.4 km || 
|-id=440 bgcolor=#d6d6d6
| 152440 ||  || — || October 29, 2005 || Catalina || CSS || — || align=right | 3.6 km || 
|-id=441 bgcolor=#E9E9E9
| 152441 ||  || — || October 30, 2005 || Kitt Peak || Spacewatch || — || align=right | 1.3 km || 
|-id=442 bgcolor=#d6d6d6
| 152442 ||  || — || October 29, 2005 || Catalina || CSS || — || align=right | 5.0 km || 
|-id=443 bgcolor=#d6d6d6
| 152443 ||  || — || October 28, 2005 || Mount Lemmon || Mount Lemmon Survey || KOR || align=right | 2.5 km || 
|-id=444 bgcolor=#d6d6d6
| 152444 ||  || — || October 30, 2005 || Kitt Peak || Spacewatch || — || align=right | 5.0 km || 
|-id=445 bgcolor=#E9E9E9
| 152445 ||  || — || October 30, 2005 || Mount Lemmon || Mount Lemmon Survey || — || align=right | 3.3 km || 
|-id=446 bgcolor=#E9E9E9
| 152446 ||  || — || October 24, 2005 || Palomar || NEAT || EUN || align=right | 2.2 km || 
|-id=447 bgcolor=#fefefe
| 152447 ||  || — || October 24, 2005 || Palomar || NEAT || — || align=right | 1.5 km || 
|-id=448 bgcolor=#E9E9E9
| 152448 ||  || — || October 22, 2005 || Catalina || CSS || — || align=right | 1.8 km || 
|-id=449 bgcolor=#E9E9E9
| 152449 ||  || — || October 24, 2005 || Anderson Mesa || LONEOS || AGN || align=right | 2.0 km || 
|-id=450 bgcolor=#d6d6d6
| 152450 ||  || — || October 26, 2005 || Anderson Mesa || LONEOS || — || align=right | 4.4 km || 
|-id=451 bgcolor=#E9E9E9
| 152451 ||  || — || October 27, 2005 || Catalina || CSS || — || align=right | 2.7 km || 
|-id=452 bgcolor=#E9E9E9
| 152452 ||  || — || October 27, 2005 || Catalina || CSS || AER || align=right | 2.2 km || 
|-id=453 bgcolor=#d6d6d6
| 152453 ||  || — || October 27, 2005 || Catalina || CSS || — || align=right | 4.4 km || 
|-id=454 bgcolor=#fefefe
| 152454 Darnyi ||  ||  || November 3, 2005 || Piszkéstető || K. Sárneczky || — || align=right | 1.1 km || 
|-id=455 bgcolor=#d6d6d6
| 152455 ||  || — || November 11, 2005 || RAS || R. Hutsebaut || EOS || align=right | 3.3 km || 
|-id=456 bgcolor=#d6d6d6
| 152456 ||  || — || November 1, 2005 || Kitt Peak || Spacewatch || — || align=right | 2.5 km || 
|-id=457 bgcolor=#fefefe
| 152457 ||  || — || November 3, 2005 || Catalina || CSS || FLO || align=right data-sort-value="0.97" | 970 m || 
|-id=458 bgcolor=#E9E9E9
| 152458 ||  || — || November 3, 2005 || Catalina || CSS || — || align=right | 3.1 km || 
|-id=459 bgcolor=#d6d6d6
| 152459 ||  || — || November 1, 2005 || Anderson Mesa || LONEOS || TIR || align=right | 5.8 km || 
|-id=460 bgcolor=#E9E9E9
| 152460 ||  || — || November 3, 2005 || Socorro || LINEAR || — || align=right | 2.5 km || 
|-id=461 bgcolor=#E9E9E9
| 152461 ||  || — || November 5, 2005 || Socorro || LINEAR || GEF || align=right | 2.4 km || 
|-id=462 bgcolor=#d6d6d6
| 152462 ||  || — || November 1, 2005 || Mount Lemmon || Mount Lemmon Survey || — || align=right | 4.1 km || 
|-id=463 bgcolor=#d6d6d6
| 152463 ||  || — || November 4, 2005 || Socorro || LINEAR || — || align=right | 3.8 km || 
|-id=464 bgcolor=#d6d6d6
| 152464 ||  || — || November 5, 2005 || Kitt Peak || Spacewatch || — || align=right | 3.3 km || 
|-id=465 bgcolor=#E9E9E9
| 152465 ||  || — || November 7, 2005 || Socorro || LINEAR || — || align=right | 2.7 km || 
|-id=466 bgcolor=#d6d6d6
| 152466 ||  || — || November 1, 2005 || Socorro || LINEAR || THM || align=right | 4.5 km || 
|-id=467 bgcolor=#E9E9E9
| 152467 ||  || — || November 10, 2005 || Mount Lemmon || Mount Lemmon Survey || — || align=right | 1.4 km || 
|-id=468 bgcolor=#d6d6d6
| 152468 ||  || — || November 10, 2005 || Eskridge || Farpoint Obs. || — || align=right | 3.2 km || 
|-id=469 bgcolor=#E9E9E9
| 152469 ||  || — || November 6, 2005 || Mount Lemmon || Mount Lemmon Survey || EUN || align=right | 2.0 km || 
|-id=470 bgcolor=#E9E9E9
| 152470 || 2005 WJ || — || November 19, 2005 || RAS || A. Lowe || — || align=right | 3.6 km || 
|-id=471 bgcolor=#d6d6d6
| 152471 ||  || — || November 21, 2005 || Wrightwood || J. W. Young || — || align=right | 4.2 km || 
|-id=472 bgcolor=#E9E9E9
| 152472 ||  || — || November 23, 2005 || Ottmarsheim || C. Rinner || — || align=right | 4.5 km || 
|-id=473 bgcolor=#d6d6d6
| 152473 ||  || — || November 20, 2005 || Catalina || CSS || — || align=right | 3.1 km || 
|-id=474 bgcolor=#d6d6d6
| 152474 ||  || — || November 21, 2005 || Anderson Mesa || LONEOS || — || align=right | 4.2 km || 
|-id=475 bgcolor=#E9E9E9
| 152475 ||  || — || November 21, 2005 || Catalina || CSS || AST || align=right | 3.0 km || 
|-id=476 bgcolor=#E9E9E9
| 152476 ||  || — || November 24, 2005 || Palomar || NEAT || — || align=right | 4.4 km || 
|-id=477 bgcolor=#E9E9E9
| 152477 ||  || — || November 21, 2005 || Kitt Peak || Spacewatch || AGN || align=right | 1.7 km || 
|-id=478 bgcolor=#d6d6d6
| 152478 ||  || — || November 21, 2005 || Kitt Peak || Spacewatch || — || align=right | 6.4 km || 
|-id=479 bgcolor=#d6d6d6
| 152479 ||  || — || November 21, 2005 || Catalina || CSS || EOS || align=right | 3.7 km || 
|-id=480 bgcolor=#d6d6d6
| 152480 ||  || — || November 25, 2005 || Mount Lemmon || Mount Lemmon Survey || EOS || align=right | 3.4 km || 
|-id=481 bgcolor=#d6d6d6
| 152481 Stabia ||  ||  || November 30, 2005 || RAS || E. Guido || ALA || align=right | 6.9 km || 
|-id=482 bgcolor=#d6d6d6
| 152482 ||  || — || November 21, 2005 || Anderson Mesa || LONEOS || — || align=right | 3.3 km || 
|-id=483 bgcolor=#d6d6d6
| 152483 ||  || — || November 25, 2005 || Palomar || NEAT || — || align=right | 6.4 km || 
|-id=484 bgcolor=#E9E9E9
| 152484 ||  || — || November 26, 2005 || Catalina || CSS || — || align=right | 3.2 km || 
|-id=485 bgcolor=#E9E9E9
| 152485 ||  || — || November 25, 2005 || Mount Lemmon || Mount Lemmon Survey || — || align=right | 2.7 km || 
|-id=486 bgcolor=#d6d6d6
| 152486 ||  || — || November 27, 2005 || Anderson Mesa || LONEOS || — || align=right | 4.3 km || 
|-id=487 bgcolor=#d6d6d6
| 152487 ||  || — || November 25, 2005 || Kitt Peak || Spacewatch || KAR || align=right | 1.7 km || 
|-id=488 bgcolor=#d6d6d6
| 152488 ||  || — || November 25, 2005 || Kitt Peak || Spacewatch || — || align=right | 8.8 km || 
|-id=489 bgcolor=#d6d6d6
| 152489 ||  || — || November 25, 2005 || Mount Lemmon || Mount Lemmon Survey || — || align=right | 5.7 km || 
|-id=490 bgcolor=#d6d6d6
| 152490 ||  || — || November 26, 2005 || Catalina || CSS || — || align=right | 4.5 km || 
|-id=491 bgcolor=#d6d6d6
| 152491 ||  || — || November 28, 2005 || Catalina || CSS || HYG || align=right | 6.6 km || 
|-id=492 bgcolor=#d6d6d6
| 152492 ||  || — || November 28, 2005 || Catalina || CSS || EOS || align=right | 3.7 km || 
|-id=493 bgcolor=#d6d6d6
| 152493 ||  || — || November 25, 2005 || Mount Lemmon || Mount Lemmon Survey || THM || align=right | 3.4 km || 
|-id=494 bgcolor=#d6d6d6
| 152494 ||  || — || November 28, 2005 || Catalina || CSS || EOS || align=right | 3.8 km || 
|-id=495 bgcolor=#E9E9E9
| 152495 ||  || — || November 28, 2005 || Catalina || CSS || — || align=right | 3.2 km || 
|-id=496 bgcolor=#d6d6d6
| 152496 ||  || — || November 29, 2005 || Catalina || CSS || — || align=right | 5.3 km || 
|-id=497 bgcolor=#E9E9E9
| 152497 ||  || — || November 29, 2005 || Mount Lemmon || Mount Lemmon Survey || — || align=right | 3.4 km || 
|-id=498 bgcolor=#E9E9E9
| 152498 ||  || — || November 25, 2005 || Mount Lemmon || Mount Lemmon Survey || — || align=right | 1.8 km || 
|-id=499 bgcolor=#fefefe
| 152499 ||  || — || November 29, 2005 || Palomar || NEAT || FLO || align=right data-sort-value="0.98" | 980 m || 
|-id=500 bgcolor=#d6d6d6
| 152500 ||  || — || November 29, 2005 || Mount Lemmon || Mount Lemmon Survey || — || align=right | 3.5 km || 
|}

152501–152600 

|-bgcolor=#d6d6d6
| 152501 ||  || — || November 30, 2005 || Kitt Peak || Spacewatch || THM || align=right | 3.8 km || 
|-id=502 bgcolor=#d6d6d6
| 152502 ||  || — || November 25, 2005 || Catalina || CSS || EOS || align=right | 3.1 km || 
|-id=503 bgcolor=#d6d6d6
| 152503 ||  || — || November 26, 2005 || Catalina || CSS || — || align=right | 3.8 km || 
|-id=504 bgcolor=#d6d6d6
| 152504 ||  || — || November 29, 2005 || Palomar || NEAT || — || align=right | 4.5 km || 
|-id=505 bgcolor=#fefefe
| 152505 ||  || — || November 29, 2005 || Palomar || NEAT || — || align=right | 1.3 km || 
|-id=506 bgcolor=#d6d6d6
| 152506 ||  || — || December 4, 2005 || Junk Bond || D. Healy || THM || align=right | 3.8 km || 
|-id=507 bgcolor=#E9E9E9
| 152507 ||  || — || December 1, 2005 || Mount Lemmon || Mount Lemmon Survey || — || align=right | 3.2 km || 
|-id=508 bgcolor=#E9E9E9
| 152508 ||  || — || December 5, 2005 || RAS || A. Lowe || — || align=right | 3.6 km || 
|-id=509 bgcolor=#E9E9E9
| 152509 ||  || — || December 5, 2005 || Mount Lemmon || Mount Lemmon Survey || — || align=right | 1.4 km || 
|-id=510 bgcolor=#d6d6d6
| 152510 ||  || — || December 6, 2005 || Socorro || LINEAR || — || align=right | 4.4 km || 
|-id=511 bgcolor=#E9E9E9
| 152511 ||  || — || December 21, 2005 || Kitt Peak || Spacewatch || — || align=right | 1.1 km || 
|-id=512 bgcolor=#d6d6d6
| 152512 ||  || — || December 21, 2005 || Catalina || CSS || — || align=right | 7.2 km || 
|-id=513 bgcolor=#E9E9E9
| 152513 ||  || — || December 23, 2005 || Kitt Peak || Spacewatch || HNS || align=right | 2.2 km || 
|-id=514 bgcolor=#d6d6d6
| 152514 ||  || — || December 26, 2005 || Kitt Peak || Spacewatch || THM || align=right | 3.5 km || 
|-id=515 bgcolor=#d6d6d6
| 152515 ||  || — || December 29, 2005 || Socorro || LINEAR || — || align=right | 5.1 km || 
|-id=516 bgcolor=#d6d6d6
| 152516 ||  || — || January 6, 2006 || Kitt Peak || Spacewatch || — || align=right | 3.7 km || 
|-id=517 bgcolor=#C2FFFF
| 152517 ||  || — || January 6, 2006 || Kitt Peak || Spacewatch || L5 || align=right | 12 km || 
|-id=518 bgcolor=#d6d6d6
| 152518 ||  || — || January 25, 2006 || Mount Lemmon || Mount Lemmon Survey || — || align=right | 3.5 km || 
|-id=519 bgcolor=#C2FFFF
| 152519 ||  || — || February 3, 2006 || Anderson Mesa || LONEOS || L5 || align=right | 16 km || 
|-id=520 bgcolor=#d6d6d6
| 152520 ||  || — || April 9, 2006 || Kitt Peak || Spacewatch || — || align=right | 3.2 km || 
|-id=521 bgcolor=#E9E9E9
| 152521 ||  || — || May 21, 2006 || RAS || A. Lowe || DOR || align=right | 3.9 km || 
|-id=522 bgcolor=#fefefe
| 152522 ||  || — || September 17, 2006 || Socorro || LINEAR || — || align=right | 1.2 km || 
|-id=523 bgcolor=#E9E9E9
| 152523 ||  || — || October 17, 2006 || Kitt Peak || Spacewatch || — || align=right | 2.7 km || 
|-id=524 bgcolor=#fefefe
| 152524 ||  || — || October 16, 2006 || Catalina || CSS || — || align=right | 1.7 km || 
|-id=525 bgcolor=#d6d6d6
| 152525 ||  || — || November 11, 2006 || Kitt Peak || Spacewatch || — || align=right | 3.6 km || 
|-id=526 bgcolor=#fefefe
| 152526 ||  || — || November 11, 2006 || Kitt Peak || Spacewatch || — || align=right | 1.5 km || 
|-id=527 bgcolor=#d6d6d6
| 152527 ||  || — || November 11, 2006 || Kitt Peak || Spacewatch || — || align=right | 4.2 km || 
|-id=528 bgcolor=#d6d6d6
| 152528 ||  || — || November 14, 2006 || Socorro || LINEAR || 7:4 || align=right | 6.5 km || 
|-id=529 bgcolor=#E9E9E9
| 152529 ||  || — || December 9, 2006 || Kitt Peak || Spacewatch || GEF || align=right | 2.2 km || 
|-id=530 bgcolor=#E9E9E9
| 152530 ||  || — || December 16, 2006 || Mount Lemmon || Mount Lemmon Survey || — || align=right | 2.0 km || 
|-id=531 bgcolor=#fefefe
| 152531 ||  || — || December 24, 2006 || Catalina || CSS || — || align=right | 1.2 km || 
|-id=532 bgcolor=#d6d6d6
| 152532 ||  || — || January 10, 2007 || Catalina || CSS || — || align=right | 6.0 km || 
|-id=533 bgcolor=#fefefe
| 152533 Aggas ||  ||  || January 8, 2007 || Mount Lemmon || Mount Lemmon Survey || — || align=right | 1.4 km || 
|-id=534 bgcolor=#E9E9E9
| 152534 ||  || — || January 24, 2007 || RAS || A. Lowe || JUN || align=right | 1.4 km || 
|-id=535 bgcolor=#fefefe
| 152535 ||  || — || January 16, 2007 || Catalina || CSS || H || align=right | 1.0 km || 
|-id=536 bgcolor=#E9E9E9
| 152536 || 4265 P-L || — || September 24, 1960 || Palomar || PLS || — || align=right | 3.2 km || 
|-id=537 bgcolor=#d6d6d6
| 152537 || 2056 T-1 || — || March 25, 1971 || Palomar || PLS || — || align=right | 5.4 km || 
|-id=538 bgcolor=#E9E9E9
| 152538 || 3035 T-1 || — || March 26, 1971 || Palomar || PLS || — || align=right | 4.1 km || 
|-id=539 bgcolor=#E9E9E9
| 152539 || 3194 T-1 || — || March 26, 1971 || Palomar || PLS || — || align=right | 1.6 km || 
|-id=540 bgcolor=#E9E9E9
| 152540 || 4358 T-1 || — || March 26, 1971 || Palomar || PLS || — || align=right | 1.8 km || 
|-id=541 bgcolor=#fefefe
| 152541 || 1140 T-2 || — || September 29, 1973 || Palomar || PLS || NYS || align=right | 1.0 km || 
|-id=542 bgcolor=#E9E9E9
| 152542 || 3135 T-2 || — || September 30, 1973 || Palomar || PLS || XIZ || align=right | 2.4 km || 
|-id=543 bgcolor=#E9E9E9
| 152543 || 3420 T-2 || — || September 30, 1973 || Palomar || PLS || INO || align=right | 2.1 km || 
|-id=544 bgcolor=#fefefe
| 152544 || 4427 T-2 || — || September 30, 1973 || Palomar || PLS || — || align=right | 1.0 km || 
|-id=545 bgcolor=#E9E9E9
| 152545 || 4473 T-2 || — || September 30, 1973 || Palomar || PLS || — || align=right | 1.2 km || 
|-id=546 bgcolor=#E9E9E9
| 152546 || 4729 T-2 || — || September 30, 1973 || Palomar || PLS || — || align=right | 1.6 km || 
|-id=547 bgcolor=#E9E9E9
| 152547 || 5052 T-2 || — || September 25, 1973 || Palomar || PLS || — || align=right | 3.2 km || 
|-id=548 bgcolor=#E9E9E9
| 152548 || 5085 T-2 || — || September 25, 1973 || Palomar || PLS || — || align=right | 1.4 km || 
|-id=549 bgcolor=#d6d6d6
| 152549 || 1119 T-3 || — || October 17, 1977 || Palomar || PLS || THB || align=right | 4.9 km || 
|-id=550 bgcolor=#fefefe
| 152550 || 2677 T-3 || — || October 11, 1977 || Palomar || PLS || V || align=right | 1.2 km || 
|-id=551 bgcolor=#E9E9E9
| 152551 || 3190 T-3 || — || October 16, 1977 || Palomar || PLS || — || align=right | 1.3 km || 
|-id=552 bgcolor=#d6d6d6
| 152552 || 3810 T-3 || — || October 16, 1977 || Palomar || PLS || THM || align=right | 3.3 km || 
|-id=553 bgcolor=#E9E9E9
| 152553 || 4264 T-3 || — || October 16, 1977 || Palomar || PLS || — || align=right | 4.2 km || 
|-id=554 bgcolor=#E9E9E9
| 152554 || 4320 T-3 || — || October 16, 1977 || Palomar || PLS || — || align=right | 3.4 km || 
|-id=555 bgcolor=#d6d6d6
| 152555 ||  || — || September 30, 1975 || Palomar || S. J. Bus || — || align=right | 5.7 km || 
|-id=556 bgcolor=#E9E9E9
| 152556 ||  || — || March 16, 1980 || La Silla || C.-I. Lagerkvist || — || align=right | 6.3 km || 
|-id=557 bgcolor=#fefefe
| 152557 ||  || — || March 1, 1981 || Siding Spring || S. J. Bus || KLI || align=right | 3.3 km || 
|-id=558 bgcolor=#FFC2E0
| 152558 || 1990 SA || — || September 16, 1990 || Siding Spring || R. H. McNaught || AMO +1km || align=right | 1.4 km || 
|-id=559 bgcolor=#E9E9E9
| 152559 Bodelschwingh ||  ||  || October 12, 1990 || Tautenburg Observatory || F. Börngen, L. D. Schmadel || — || align=right | 3.5 km || 
|-id=560 bgcolor=#FFC2E0
| 152560 || 1991 BN || — || January 19, 1991 || Kitt Peak || Spacewatch || APOPHA || align=right data-sort-value="0.54" | 540 m || 
|-id=561 bgcolor=#FFC2E0
| 152561 || 1991 RB || — || September 4, 1991 || Siding Spring || R. H. McNaught || APOPHA || align=right data-sort-value="0.52" | 520 m || 
|-id=562 bgcolor=#fefefe
| 152562 ||  || — || September 13, 1991 || Palomar || A. Lowe || FLO || align=right | 1.2 km || 
|-id=563 bgcolor=#FFC2E0
| 152563 || 1992 BF || — || January 30, 1992 || Palomar || K. J. Lawrence, E. F. Helin || ATE || align=right data-sort-value="0.27" | 270 m || 
|-id=564 bgcolor=#FFC2E0
| 152564 || 1992 HF || — || April 24, 1992 || Kitt Peak || Spacewatch || APO || align=right data-sort-value="0.28" | 280 m || 
|-id=565 bgcolor=#fefefe
| 152565 ||  || — || September 28, 1992 || Kitt Peak || Spacewatch || — || align=right data-sort-value="0.91" | 910 m || 
|-id=566 bgcolor=#E9E9E9
| 152566 ||  || — || March 17, 1993 || La Silla || UESAC || — || align=right | 4.2 km || 
|-id=567 bgcolor=#E9E9E9
| 152567 ||  || — || March 19, 1993 || La Silla || UESAC || — || align=right | 4.9 km || 
|-id=568 bgcolor=#E9E9E9
| 152568 ||  || — || March 19, 1993 || La Silla || UESAC || HNA || align=right | 4.8 km || 
|-id=569 bgcolor=#fefefe
| 152569 ||  || — || March 19, 1993 || La Silla || UESAC || V || align=right | 1.0 km || 
|-id=570 bgcolor=#E9E9E9
| 152570 ||  || — || March 21, 1993 || La Silla || UESAC || — || align=right | 3.8 km || 
|-id=571 bgcolor=#fefefe
| 152571 ||  || — || August 20, 1993 || La Silla || E. W. Elst || EUT || align=right | 1.0 km || 
|-id=572 bgcolor=#fefefe
| 152572 ||  || — || October 9, 1993 || La Silla || E. W. Elst || SUL || align=right | 3.0 km || 
|-id=573 bgcolor=#fefefe
| 152573 ||  || — || October 9, 1993 || La Silla || E. W. Elst || NYS || align=right | 1.1 km || 
|-id=574 bgcolor=#E9E9E9
| 152574 ||  || — || February 7, 1994 || La Silla || E. W. Elst || — || align=right | 2.4 km || 
|-id=575 bgcolor=#FFC2E0
| 152575 || 1994 GY || — || April 14, 1994 || Dynic || A. Sugie || AMO +1km || align=right | 1.4 km || 
|-id=576 bgcolor=#fefefe
| 152576 ||  || — || July 11, 1994 || La Silla || H. Debehogne, E. W. Elst || — || align=right | 1.0 km || 
|-id=577 bgcolor=#E9E9E9
| 152577 ||  || — || August 10, 1994 || La Silla || E. W. Elst || DOR || align=right | 5.0 km || 
|-id=578 bgcolor=#d6d6d6
| 152578 ||  || — || August 10, 1994 || La Silla || E. W. Elst || EOS || align=right | 3.5 km || 
|-id=579 bgcolor=#fefefe
| 152579 ||  || — || August 10, 1994 || La Silla || E. W. Elst || — || align=right | 1.5 km || 
|-id=580 bgcolor=#d6d6d6
| 152580 ||  || — || September 27, 1994 || Kitt Peak || Spacewatch || — || align=right | 3.2 km || 
|-id=581 bgcolor=#d6d6d6
| 152581 ||  || — || September 28, 1994 || Kitt Peak || Spacewatch || KOR || align=right | 1.9 km || 
|-id=582 bgcolor=#fefefe
| 152582 ||  || — || September 28, 1994 || Kitt Peak || Spacewatch || — || align=right | 1.5 km || 
|-id=583 bgcolor=#fefefe
| 152583 || 1994 TF || — || October 4, 1994 || San Marcello || L. Tesi, G. Cattani || — || align=right | 1.4 km || 
|-id=584 bgcolor=#d6d6d6
| 152584 ||  || — || October 28, 1994 || Kitt Peak || Spacewatch || EOS || align=right | 2.9 km || 
|-id=585 bgcolor=#d6d6d6
| 152585 ||  || — || November 28, 1994 || Kitt Peak || Spacewatch || — || align=right | 2.5 km || 
|-id=586 bgcolor=#fefefe
| 152586 ||  || — || November 28, 1994 || Kitt Peak || Spacewatch || V || align=right | 1.1 km || 
|-id=587 bgcolor=#fefefe
| 152587 ||  || — || December 4, 1994 || Kitt Peak || Spacewatch || — || align=right data-sort-value="0.96" | 960 m || 
|-id=588 bgcolor=#E9E9E9
| 152588 ||  || — || March 2, 1995 || Kitt Peak || Spacewatch || — || align=right | 1.5 km || 
|-id=589 bgcolor=#E9E9E9
| 152589 ||  || — || June 25, 1995 || Kitt Peak || Spacewatch || ADE || align=right | 5.4 km || 
|-id=590 bgcolor=#E9E9E9
| 152590 ||  || — || July 30, 1995 || Ondřejov || P. Pravec || — || align=right | 1.9 km || 
|-id=591 bgcolor=#fefefe
| 152591 ||  || — || August 22, 1995 || Kitt Peak || Spacewatch || FLO || align=right data-sort-value="0.97" | 970 m || 
|-id=592 bgcolor=#E9E9E9
| 152592 ||  || — || September 22, 1995 || Ondřejov || L. Kotková || HOF || align=right | 4.1 km || 
|-id=593 bgcolor=#E9E9E9
| 152593 ||  || — || September 25, 1995 || Kitt Peak || Spacewatch || — || align=right | 2.6 km || 
|-id=594 bgcolor=#fefefe
| 152594 ||  || — || September 26, 1995 || Kitt Peak || Spacewatch || — || align=right data-sort-value="0.90" | 900 m || 
|-id=595 bgcolor=#d6d6d6
| 152595 ||  || — || September 26, 1995 || Kitt Peak || Spacewatch || — || align=right | 3.0 km || 
|-id=596 bgcolor=#fefefe
| 152596 ||  || — || September 18, 1995 || Kitt Peak || Spacewatch || — || align=right | 1.2 km || 
|-id=597 bgcolor=#d6d6d6
| 152597 ||  || — || October 15, 1995 || Kitt Peak || Spacewatch || KOR || align=right | 1.7 km || 
|-id=598 bgcolor=#E9E9E9
| 152598 ||  || — || October 15, 1995 || Kitt Peak || Spacewatch || AGN || align=right | 2.0 km || 
|-id=599 bgcolor=#d6d6d6
| 152599 ||  || — || October 17, 1995 || Kitt Peak || Spacewatch || — || align=right | 3.6 km || 
|-id=600 bgcolor=#d6d6d6
| 152600 ||  || — || October 17, 1995 || Kitt Peak || Spacewatch || BRA || align=right | 2.5 km || 
|}

152601–152700 

|-bgcolor=#fefefe
| 152601 ||  || — || October 22, 1995 || Kitt Peak || Spacewatch || — || align=right | 1.0 km || 
|-id=602 bgcolor=#fefefe
| 152602 ||  || — || October 22, 1995 || Kitt Peak || Spacewatch || — || align=right | 1.1 km || 
|-id=603 bgcolor=#FA8072
| 152603 ||  || — || November 14, 1995 || Kitt Peak || Spacewatch || — || align=right data-sort-value="0.80" | 800 m || 
|-id=604 bgcolor=#E9E9E9
| 152604 ||  || — || November 15, 1995 || Kitt Peak || Spacewatch || MRX || align=right | 2.3 km || 
|-id=605 bgcolor=#d6d6d6
| 152605 ||  || — || November 16, 1995 || Kitt Peak || Spacewatch || — || align=right | 3.1 km || 
|-id=606 bgcolor=#d6d6d6
| 152606 ||  || — || November 17, 1995 || Kitt Peak || Spacewatch || SAN || align=right | 2.4 km || 
|-id=607 bgcolor=#d6d6d6
| 152607 ||  || — || December 23, 1995 || Kitt Peak || Spacewatch || — || align=right | 3.3 km || 
|-id=608 bgcolor=#d6d6d6
| 152608 ||  || — || January 12, 1996 || Kitt Peak || Spacewatch || — || align=right | 3.3 km || 
|-id=609 bgcolor=#fefefe
| 152609 ||  || — || January 19, 1996 || Kitt Peak || Spacewatch || — || align=right | 1.1 km || 
|-id=610 bgcolor=#fefefe
| 152610 ||  || — || January 22, 1996 || Socorro || Lincoln Lab ETS || V || align=right | 1.2 km || 
|-id=611 bgcolor=#fefefe
| 152611 ||  || — || March 11, 1996 || Kitt Peak || Spacewatch || MAS || align=right | 1.0 km || 
|-id=612 bgcolor=#fefefe
| 152612 ||  || — || March 12, 1996 || Kitt Peak || Spacewatch || MAS || align=right | 1.1 km || 
|-id=613 bgcolor=#fefefe
| 152613 ||  || — || March 19, 1996 || Kitt Peak || Spacewatch || NYS || align=right | 1.0 km || 
|-id=614 bgcolor=#fefefe
| 152614 ||  || — || April 12, 1996 || Kitt Peak || Spacewatch || MAS || align=right | 1.2 km || 
|-id=615 bgcolor=#d6d6d6
| 152615 ||  || — || April 14, 1996 || Kitt Peak || Spacewatch || HYG || align=right | 3.9 km || 
|-id=616 bgcolor=#d6d6d6
| 152616 ||  || — || April 18, 1996 || La Silla || E. W. Elst || THM || align=right | 4.5 km || 
|-id=617 bgcolor=#d6d6d6
| 152617 ||  || — || May 12, 1996 || Kitt Peak || Spacewatch || THM || align=right | 3.5 km || 
|-id=618 bgcolor=#fefefe
| 152618 ||  || — || June 16, 1996 || Kitt Peak || Spacewatch || V || align=right | 1.2 km || 
|-id=619 bgcolor=#E9E9E9
| 152619 ||  || — || September 5, 1996 || Kitt Peak || Spacewatch || — || align=right | 2.0 km || 
|-id=620 bgcolor=#E9E9E9
| 152620 ||  || — || September 8, 1996 || Kitt Peak || Spacewatch || — || align=right | 1.6 km || 
|-id=621 bgcolor=#E9E9E9
| 152621 ||  || — || September 8, 1996 || Kitt Peak || Spacewatch || — || align=right | 1.6 km || 
|-id=622 bgcolor=#E9E9E9
| 152622 ||  || — || October 11, 1996 || Kitt Peak || Spacewatch || — || align=right | 1.8 km || 
|-id=623 bgcolor=#fefefe
| 152623 ||  || — || December 4, 1996 || Kitt Peak || Spacewatch || FLO || align=right | 1.0 km || 
|-id=624 bgcolor=#E9E9E9
| 152624 ||  || — || December 5, 1996 || Kitt Peak || Spacewatch || PAD || align=right | 2.7 km || 
|-id=625 bgcolor=#d6d6d6
| 152625 ||  || — || December 12, 1996 || Kitt Peak || Spacewatch || EOS || align=right | 3.0 km || 
|-id=626 bgcolor=#d6d6d6
| 152626 ||  || — || February 3, 1997 || Kitt Peak || Spacewatch || — || align=right | 3.8 km || 
|-id=627 bgcolor=#FA8072
| 152627 || 1997 DF || — || February 26, 1997 || Ondřejov || L. Kotková || — || align=right data-sort-value="0.68" | 680 m || 
|-id=628 bgcolor=#d6d6d6
| 152628 ||  || — || March 9, 1997 || Kitt Peak || Spacewatch || — || align=right | 3.6 km || 
|-id=629 bgcolor=#d6d6d6
| 152629 ||  || — || March 11, 1997 || Kitt Peak || Spacewatch || — || align=right | 4.1 km || 
|-id=630 bgcolor=#fefefe
| 152630 ||  || — || April 7, 1997 || Kitt Peak || Spacewatch || — || align=right | 1.2 km || 
|-id=631 bgcolor=#fefefe
| 152631 ||  || — || April 8, 1997 || Kitt Peak || Spacewatch || — || align=right | 1.1 km || 
|-id=632 bgcolor=#fefefe
| 152632 ||  || — || April 3, 1997 || Socorro || LINEAR || — || align=right | 1.5 km || 
|-id=633 bgcolor=#fefefe
| 152633 ||  || — || April 6, 1997 || Socorro || LINEAR || — || align=right | 1.9 km || 
|-id=634 bgcolor=#d6d6d6
| 152634 || 1997 HN || — || April 28, 1997 || Kitt Peak || Spacewatch || — || align=right | 4.0 km || 
|-id=635 bgcolor=#fefefe
| 152635 ||  || — || May 1, 1997 || Kitt Peak || Spacewatch || — || align=right | 1.2 km || 
|-id=636 bgcolor=#fefefe
| 152636 ||  || — || May 29, 1997 || Kitt Peak || Spacewatch || — || align=right | 1.00 km || 
|-id=637 bgcolor=#FFC2E0
| 152637 ||  || — || July 5, 1997 || Haleakala || NEAT || ATE +1kmPHA || align=right data-sort-value="0.88" | 880 m || 
|-id=638 bgcolor=#fefefe
| 152638 ||  || — || July 29, 1997 || Majorca || Á. López J., R. Pacheco || NYS || align=right | 1.2 km || 
|-id=639 bgcolor=#fefefe
| 152639 || 1997 PT || — || August 3, 1997 || Caussols || ODAS || NYS || align=right data-sort-value="0.98" | 980 m || 
|-id=640 bgcolor=#fefefe
| 152640 ||  || — || August 5, 1997 || Xinglong || SCAP || V || align=right | 1.4 km || 
|-id=641 bgcolor=#E9E9E9
| 152641 Fredreed ||  ||  || September 5, 1997 || Alfred University || D. R. De Graff, J. S. Weaver || — || align=right | 1.6 km || 
|-id=642 bgcolor=#fefefe
| 152642 ||  || — || September 10, 1997 || Prescott || P. G. Comba || — || align=right | 2.2 km || 
|-id=643 bgcolor=#fefefe
| 152643 ||  || — || September 23, 1997 || Kitt Peak || Spacewatch || MAS || align=right | 1.1 km || 
|-id=644 bgcolor=#fefefe
| 152644 ||  || — || September 23, 1997 || Kitt Peak || Spacewatch || — || align=right | 1.1 km || 
|-id=645 bgcolor=#fefefe
| 152645 ||  || — || September 28, 1997 || Kitt Peak || Spacewatch || NYS || align=right data-sort-value="0.99" | 990 m || 
|-id=646 bgcolor=#fefefe
| 152646 ||  || — || September 23, 1997 || Xinglong || SCAP || KLI || align=right | 3.3 km || 
|-id=647 bgcolor=#fefefe
| 152647 Rinako ||  ||  || October 29, 1997 || Hadano Obs. || A. Asami || — || align=right | 3.1 km || 
|-id=648 bgcolor=#FA8072
| 152648 ||  || — || October 28, 1997 || Socorro || LINEAR || H || align=right | 1.9 km || 
|-id=649 bgcolor=#fefefe
| 152649 ||  || — || October 25, 1997 || Anderson Mesa || B. A. Skiff || — || align=right | 2.0 km || 
|-id=650 bgcolor=#E9E9E9
| 152650 ||  || — || November 8, 1997 || Oizumi || T. Kobayashi || — || align=right | 2.1 km || 
|-id=651 bgcolor=#E9E9E9
| 152651 ||  || — || November 1, 1997 || Xinglong || SCAP || — || align=right | 1.8 km || 
|-id=652 bgcolor=#E9E9E9
| 152652 ||  || — || November 20, 1997 || Kitt Peak || Spacewatch || — || align=right | 1.5 km || 
|-id=653 bgcolor=#fefefe
| 152653 ||  || — || November 22, 1997 || Kitt Peak || Spacewatch || — || align=right | 1.7 km || 
|-id=654 bgcolor=#fefefe
| 152654 ||  || — || November 23, 1997 || Kitt Peak || Spacewatch || MAS || align=right | 1.1 km || 
|-id=655 bgcolor=#fefefe
| 152655 ||  || — || November 23, 1997 || Kitt Peak || Spacewatch || SUL || align=right | 3.0 km || 
|-id=656 bgcolor=#E9E9E9
| 152656 ||  || — || November 29, 1997 || Kitt Peak || Spacewatch || — || align=right | 1.5 km || 
|-id=657 bgcolor=#E9E9E9
| 152657 Yukifumi ||  ||  || December 4, 1997 || Kuma Kogen || A. Nakamura || — || align=right | 1.9 km || 
|-id=658 bgcolor=#E9E9E9
| 152658 ||  || — || December 5, 1997 || Caussols || ODAS || — || align=right | 1.2 km || 
|-id=659 bgcolor=#E9E9E9
| 152659 ||  || — || December 4, 1997 || Xinglong || SCAP || — || align=right | 1.9 km || 
|-id=660 bgcolor=#E9E9E9
| 152660 || 1998 CW || — || February 5, 1998 || Kleť || M. Tichý, Z. Moravec || MRX || align=right | 1.6 km || 
|-id=661 bgcolor=#E9E9E9
| 152661 ||  || — || February 20, 1998 || Kleť || Kleť Obs. || VIB || align=right | 4.3 km || 
|-id=662 bgcolor=#E9E9E9
| 152662 ||  || — || February 21, 1998 || Xinglong || SCAP || GEF || align=right | 1.9 km || 
|-id=663 bgcolor=#E9E9E9
| 152663 ||  || — || February 21, 1998 || Xinglong || SCAP || — || align=right | 6.1 km || 
|-id=664 bgcolor=#FFC2E0
| 152664 ||  || — || March 20, 1998 || Socorro || LINEAR || APOPHA || align=right data-sort-value="0.42" | 420 m || 
|-id=665 bgcolor=#E9E9E9
| 152665 ||  || — || March 18, 1998 || Kitt Peak || Spacewatch || — || align=right | 2.9 km || 
|-id=666 bgcolor=#E9E9E9
| 152666 ||  || — || March 20, 1998 || Kitt Peak || Spacewatch || HEN || align=right | 1.5 km || 
|-id=667 bgcolor=#FFC2E0
| 152667 ||  || — || March 24, 1998 || Socorro || LINEAR || APO +1km || align=right | 2.0 km || 
|-id=668 bgcolor=#E9E9E9
| 152668 ||  || — || March 20, 1998 || Socorro || LINEAR || — || align=right | 3.9 km || 
|-id=669 bgcolor=#E9E9E9
| 152669 ||  || — || March 22, 1998 || Socorro || LINEAR || — || align=right | 3.9 km || 
|-id=670 bgcolor=#E9E9E9
| 152670 ||  || — || April 2, 1998 || Socorro || LINEAR || — || align=right | 4.9 km || 
|-id=671 bgcolor=#FFC2E0
| 152671 ||  || — || April 21, 1998 || Socorro || LINEAR || APOPHA || align=right data-sort-value="0.3" | 300 m || 
|-id=672 bgcolor=#E9E9E9
| 152672 ||  || — || April 21, 1998 || Caussols || ODAS || — || align=right | 4.5 km || 
|-id=673 bgcolor=#E9E9E9
| 152673 ||  || — || April 17, 1998 || Kitt Peak || Spacewatch || — || align=right | 3.7 km || 
|-id=674 bgcolor=#E9E9E9
| 152674 ||  || — || April 27, 1998 || Kitt Peak || Spacewatch || GEF || align=right | 3.1 km || 
|-id=675 bgcolor=#E9E9E9
| 152675 ||  || — || April 21, 1998 || Socorro || LINEAR || — || align=right | 2.9 km || 
|-id=676 bgcolor=#E9E9E9
| 152676 ||  || — || April 21, 1998 || Socorro || LINEAR || — || align=right | 3.4 km || 
|-id=677 bgcolor=#E9E9E9
| 152677 ||  || — || April 23, 1998 || Socorro || LINEAR || GEF || align=right | 2.7 km || 
|-id=678 bgcolor=#E9E9E9
| 152678 ||  || — || April 23, 1998 || Socorro || LINEAR || DOR || align=right | 4.6 km || 
|-id=679 bgcolor=#FFC2E0
| 152679 ||  || — || May 22, 1998 || Socorro || LINEAR || APO +1kmslow || align=right | 4.2 km || 
|-id=680 bgcolor=#FFC2E0
| 152680 ||  || — || May 27, 1998 || Socorro || LINEAR || APOPHA || align=right data-sort-value="0.47" | 470 m || 
|-id=681 bgcolor=#d6d6d6
| 152681 ||  || — || May 22, 1998 || Kitt Peak || Spacewatch || EOS || align=right | 2.6 km || 
|-id=682 bgcolor=#E9E9E9
| 152682 ||  || — || May 22, 1998 || Socorro || LINEAR || — || align=right | 4.5 km || 
|-id=683 bgcolor=#E9E9E9
| 152683 ||  || — || May 22, 1998 || Socorro || LINEAR || INO || align=right | 2.4 km || 
|-id=684 bgcolor=#E9E9E9
| 152684 ||  || — || May 30, 1998 || Kitt Peak || Spacewatch || INO || align=right | 2.2 km || 
|-id=685 bgcolor=#FFC2E0
| 152685 || 1998 MZ || — || June 18, 1998 || Kitt Peak || Spacewatch || APOPHA || align=right data-sort-value="0.50" | 500 m || 
|-id=686 bgcolor=#fefefe
| 152686 ||  || — || August 17, 1998 || Socorro || LINEAR || — || align=right | 1.6 km || 
|-id=687 bgcolor=#fefefe
| 152687 ||  || — || August 30, 1998 || Kitt Peak || Spacewatch || — || align=right data-sort-value="0.80" | 800 m || 
|-id=688 bgcolor=#fefefe
| 152688 ||  || — || August 23, 1998 || Anderson Mesa || LONEOS || — || align=right | 1.3 km || 
|-id=689 bgcolor=#fefefe
| 152689 ||  || — || August 30, 1998 || Xinglong || SCAP || — || align=right | 1.3 km || 
|-id=690 bgcolor=#d6d6d6
| 152690 ||  || — || August 24, 1998 || Socorro || LINEAR || TIR || align=right | 4.7 km || 
|-id=691 bgcolor=#fefefe
| 152691 ||  || — || August 26, 1998 || La Silla || E. W. Elst || — || align=right | 1.5 km || 
|-id=692 bgcolor=#d6d6d6
| 152692 ||  || — || August 30, 1998 || Kitt Peak || Spacewatch || HYG || align=right | 3.3 km || 
|-id=693 bgcolor=#FA8072
| 152693 ||  || — || September 14, 1998 || Socorro || LINEAR || H || align=right | 1.0 km || 
|-id=694 bgcolor=#d6d6d6
| 152694 ||  || — || September 12, 1998 || Kitt Peak || Spacewatch || — || align=right | 6.8 km || 
|-id=695 bgcolor=#d6d6d6
| 152695 ||  || — || September 15, 1998 || Kitt Peak || Spacewatch || — || align=right | 3.0 km || 
|-id=696 bgcolor=#fefefe
| 152696 ||  || — || September 14, 1998 || Socorro || LINEAR || FLO || align=right | 1.1 km || 
|-id=697 bgcolor=#fefefe
| 152697 ||  || — || September 14, 1998 || Socorro || LINEAR || FLO || align=right | 1.2 km || 
|-id=698 bgcolor=#fefefe
| 152698 ||  || — || September 14, 1998 || Socorro || LINEAR || — || align=right | 1.1 km || 
|-id=699 bgcolor=#fefefe
| 152699 ||  || — || September 14, 1998 || Socorro || LINEAR || FLO || align=right | 1.1 km || 
|-id=700 bgcolor=#fefefe
| 152700 ||  || — || September 14, 1998 || Socorro || LINEAR || — || align=right | 1.1 km || 
|}

152701–152800 

|-bgcolor=#fefefe
| 152701 ||  || — || September 14, 1998 || Socorro || LINEAR || FLO || align=right | 1.0 km || 
|-id=702 bgcolor=#fefefe
| 152702 ||  || — || September 14, 1998 || Socorro || LINEAR || — || align=right | 1.2 km || 
|-id=703 bgcolor=#fefefe
| 152703 ||  || — || September 14, 1998 || Socorro || LINEAR || — || align=right | 1.3 km || 
|-id=704 bgcolor=#FA8072
| 152704 ||  || — || September 17, 1998 || Xinglong || SCAP || — || align=right data-sort-value="0.58" | 580 m || 
|-id=705 bgcolor=#fefefe
| 152705 ||  || — || September 23, 1998 || Kitt Peak || Spacewatch || — || align=right | 1.1 km || 
|-id=706 bgcolor=#fefefe
| 152706 ||  || — || September 16, 1998 || Anderson Mesa || LONEOS || FLO || align=right | 1.0 km || 
|-id=707 bgcolor=#d6d6d6
| 152707 ||  || — || September 21, 1998 || La Silla || E. W. Elst || HYG || align=right | 4.9 km || 
|-id=708 bgcolor=#fefefe
| 152708 ||  || — || September 26, 1998 || Socorro || LINEAR || — || align=right | 1.2 km || 
|-id=709 bgcolor=#d6d6d6
| 152709 ||  || — || September 26, 1998 || Socorro || LINEAR || HYG || align=right | 5.5 km || 
|-id=710 bgcolor=#fefefe
| 152710 ||  || — || September 26, 1998 || Socorro || LINEAR || — || align=right | 1.5 km || 
|-id=711 bgcolor=#d6d6d6
| 152711 ||  || — || September 26, 1998 || Socorro || LINEAR || — || align=right | 5.6 km || 
|-id=712 bgcolor=#fefefe
| 152712 ||  || — || September 26, 1998 || Socorro || LINEAR || — || align=right | 1.3 km || 
|-id=713 bgcolor=#fefefe
| 152713 ||  || — || September 26, 1998 || Socorro || LINEAR || ERI || align=right | 1.2 km || 
|-id=714 bgcolor=#d6d6d6
| 152714 ||  || — || September 26, 1998 || Socorro || LINEAR || — || align=right | 5.7 km || 
|-id=715 bgcolor=#d6d6d6
| 152715 ||  || — || September 26, 1998 || Socorro || LINEAR || — || align=right | 5.1 km || 
|-id=716 bgcolor=#d6d6d6
| 152716 ||  || — || September 26, 1998 || Socorro || LINEAR || EMA || align=right | 7.1 km || 
|-id=717 bgcolor=#fefefe
| 152717 ||  || — || September 26, 1998 || Socorro || LINEAR || — || align=right | 1.1 km || 
|-id=718 bgcolor=#fefefe
| 152718 ||  || — || September 26, 1998 || Socorro || LINEAR || — || align=right | 1.2 km || 
|-id=719 bgcolor=#fefefe
| 152719 ||  || — || October 13, 1998 || Kitt Peak || Spacewatch || — || align=right | 1.1 km || 
|-id=720 bgcolor=#fefefe
| 152720 ||  || — || October 14, 1998 || Caussols || ODAS || NYS || align=right data-sort-value="0.85" | 850 m || 
|-id=721 bgcolor=#fefefe
| 152721 ||  || — || October 14, 1998 || Kitt Peak || Spacewatch || — || align=right data-sort-value="0.91" | 910 m || 
|-id=722 bgcolor=#fefefe
| 152722 ||  || — || October 20, 1998 || Caussols || ODAS || — || align=right | 1.3 km || 
|-id=723 bgcolor=#fefefe
| 152723 ||  || — || October 22, 1998 || Xinglong || SCAP || NYS || align=right data-sort-value="0.90" | 900 m || 
|-id=724 bgcolor=#fefefe
| 152724 ||  || — || October 28, 1998 || Socorro || LINEAR || — || align=right | 1.6 km || 
|-id=725 bgcolor=#E9E9E9
| 152725 ||  || — || October 17, 1998 || Kitt Peak || Spacewatch || — || align=right | 1.3 km || 
|-id=726 bgcolor=#fefefe
| 152726 ||  || — || October 24, 1998 || Kitt Peak || Spacewatch || V || align=right | 1.1 km || 
|-id=727 bgcolor=#fefefe
| 152727 ||  || — || November 10, 1998 || Socorro || LINEAR || — || align=right | 1.6 km || 
|-id=728 bgcolor=#d6d6d6
| 152728 ||  || — || November 10, 1998 || Socorro || LINEAR || EUP || align=right | 8.4 km || 
|-id=729 bgcolor=#d6d6d6
| 152729 ||  || — || November 10, 1998 || Socorro || LINEAR || HYG || align=right | 4.8 km || 
|-id=730 bgcolor=#fefefe
| 152730 ||  || — || November 10, 1998 || Socorro || LINEAR || NYS || align=right | 3.1 km || 
|-id=731 bgcolor=#fefefe
| 152731 ||  || — || November 15, 1998 || Kitt Peak || Spacewatch || NYS || align=right | 3.4 km || 
|-id=732 bgcolor=#fefefe
| 152732 ||  || — || November 13, 1998 || Caussols || ODAS || V || align=right | 1.1 km || 
|-id=733 bgcolor=#E9E9E9
| 152733 ||  || — || November 25, 1998 || Kleť || Kleť Obs. || — || align=right | 1.6 km || 
|-id=734 bgcolor=#fefefe
| 152734 ||  || — || November 21, 1998 || Socorro || LINEAR || — || align=right | 2.4 km || 
|-id=735 bgcolor=#fefefe
| 152735 ||  || — || November 21, 1998 || Socorro || LINEAR || — || align=right | 1.3 km || 
|-id=736 bgcolor=#fefefe
| 152736 ||  || — || November 18, 1998 || Socorro || LINEAR || — || align=right | 1.3 km || 
|-id=737 bgcolor=#fefefe
| 152737 ||  || — || November 18, 1998 || Kitt Peak || Spacewatch || NYS || align=right | 1.1 km || 
|-id=738 bgcolor=#fefefe
| 152738 ||  || — || November 19, 1998 || Anderson Mesa || LONEOS || — || align=right | 1.4 km || 
|-id=739 bgcolor=#FA8072
| 152739 ||  || — || November 21, 1998 || Socorro || LINEAR || — || align=right | 1.4 km || 
|-id=740 bgcolor=#fefefe
| 152740 ||  || — || November 18, 1998 || Kitt Peak || Spacewatch || — || align=right | 1.0 km || 
|-id=741 bgcolor=#FA8072
| 152741 ||  || — || November 16, 1998 || Haleakala || NEAT || — || align=right | 1.3 km || 
|-id=742 bgcolor=#FFC2E0
| 152742 ||  || — || December 14, 1998 || Socorro || LINEAR || ATE || align=right data-sort-value="0.41" | 410 m || 
|-id=743 bgcolor=#E9E9E9
| 152743 ||  || — || December 22, 1998 || Kleť || Kleť Obs. || — || align=right | 2.3 km || 
|-id=744 bgcolor=#fefefe
| 152744 ||  || — || December 23, 1998 || Xinglong || SCAP || MAS || align=right data-sort-value="0.99" | 990 m || 
|-id=745 bgcolor=#E9E9E9
| 152745 ||  || — || December 24, 1998 || Kleť || Kleť Obs. || — || align=right | 1.8 km || 
|-id=746 bgcolor=#fefefe
| 152746 ||  || — || December 22, 1998 || Kitt Peak || Spacewatch || MAS || align=right data-sort-value="0.90" | 900 m || 
|-id=747 bgcolor=#fefefe
| 152747 ||  || — || December 22, 1998 || Kitt Peak || Spacewatch || — || align=right data-sort-value="0.96" | 960 m || 
|-id=748 bgcolor=#FA8072
| 152748 ||  || — || December 28, 1998 || Goodricke-Pigott || R. A. Tucker || — || align=right | 1.1 km || 
|-id=749 bgcolor=#fefefe
| 152749 ||  || — || December 17, 1998 || Socorro || LINEAR || NYS || align=right | 1.2 km || 
|-id=750 bgcolor=#E9E9E9
| 152750 Brloh ||  ||  || January 21, 1999 || Kleť || J. Tichá, M. Tichý || — || align=right | 1.7 km || 
|-id=751 bgcolor=#fefefe
| 152751 ||  || — || January 16, 1999 || Kitt Peak || Spacewatch || MAS || align=right data-sort-value="0.97" | 970 m || 
|-id=752 bgcolor=#fefefe
| 152752 ||  || — || February 9, 1999 || Ondřejov || P. Pravec || H || align=right | 1.1 km || 
|-id=753 bgcolor=#fefefe
| 152753 ||  || — || February 7, 1999 || Kitt Peak || Spacewatch || MAS || align=right data-sort-value="0.90" | 900 m || 
|-id=754 bgcolor=#FFC2E0
| 152754 ||  || — || April 15, 1999 || Socorro || LINEAR || APOPHA || align=right data-sort-value="0.41" | 410 m || 
|-id=755 bgcolor=#E9E9E9
| 152755 ||  || — || April 9, 1999 || Socorro || LINEAR || — || align=right | 1.8 km || 
|-id=756 bgcolor=#FFC2E0
| 152756 ||  || — || May 10, 1999 || Socorro || LINEAR || APO || align=right data-sort-value="0.60" | 600 m || 
|-id=757 bgcolor=#E9E9E9
| 152757 ||  || — || May 12, 1999 || Woomera || F. B. Zoltowski || — || align=right | 1.6 km || 
|-id=758 bgcolor=#E9E9E9
| 152758 ||  || — || May 10, 1999 || Socorro || LINEAR || — || align=right | 1.8 km || 
|-id=759 bgcolor=#E9E9E9
| 152759 ||  || — || May 10, 1999 || Socorro || LINEAR || — || align=right | 2.4 km || 
|-id=760 bgcolor=#E9E9E9
| 152760 || 1999 KH || — || May 16, 1999 || Kitt Peak || Spacewatch || — || align=right | 2.9 km || 
|-id=761 bgcolor=#E9E9E9
| 152761 || 1999 LE || — || June 4, 1999 || Catalina || CSS || — || align=right | 2.1 km || 
|-id=762 bgcolor=#E9E9E9
| 152762 ||  || — || June 8, 1999 || Socorro || LINEAR || — || align=right | 2.7 km || 
|-id=763 bgcolor=#E9E9E9
| 152763 ||  || — || June 10, 1999 || Socorro || LINEAR || BRU || align=right | 3.0 km || 
|-id=764 bgcolor=#E9E9E9
| 152764 ||  || — || June 8, 1999 || Socorro || LINEAR || — || align=right | 5.2 km || 
|-id=765 bgcolor=#E9E9E9
| 152765 ||  || — || June 8, 1999 || Socorro || LINEAR || ADE || align=right | 4.8 km || 
|-id=766 bgcolor=#E9E9E9
| 152766 ||  || — || June 9, 1999 || Socorro || LINEAR || — || align=right | 4.5 km || 
|-id=767 bgcolor=#E9E9E9
| 152767 ||  || — || July 14, 1999 || Socorro || LINEAR || — || align=right | 2.0 km || 
|-id=768 bgcolor=#E9E9E9
| 152768 ||  || — || July 14, 1999 || Socorro || LINEAR || — || align=right | 1.8 km || 
|-id=769 bgcolor=#d6d6d6
| 152769 ||  || — || September 7, 1999 || Socorro || LINEAR || — || align=right | 6.5 km || 
|-id=770 bgcolor=#FFC2E0
| 152770 ||  || — || September 7, 1999 || Socorro || LINEAR || APOPHA || align=right data-sort-value="0.74" | 740 m || 
|-id=771 bgcolor=#FA8072
| 152771 ||  || — || September 10, 1999 || Socorro || LINEAR || — || align=right | 3.3 km || 
|-id=772 bgcolor=#E9E9E9
| 152772 ||  || — || September 7, 1999 || Socorro || LINEAR || DOR || align=right | 4.0 km || 
|-id=773 bgcolor=#E9E9E9
| 152773 ||  || — || September 7, 1999 || Socorro || LINEAR || — || align=right | 4.0 km || 
|-id=774 bgcolor=#d6d6d6
| 152774 ||  || — || September 9, 1999 || Socorro || LINEAR || — || align=right | 5.0 km || 
|-id=775 bgcolor=#d6d6d6
| 152775 ||  || — || September 9, 1999 || Socorro || LINEAR || — || align=right | 4.8 km || 
|-id=776 bgcolor=#E9E9E9
| 152776 ||  || — || September 9, 1999 || Socorro || LINEAR || DOR || align=right | 6.5 km || 
|-id=777 bgcolor=#E9E9E9
| 152777 ||  || — || September 9, 1999 || Socorro || LINEAR || XIZ || align=right | 2.9 km || 
|-id=778 bgcolor=#E9E9E9
| 152778 ||  || — || September 9, 1999 || Socorro || LINEAR || GEF || align=right | 2.3 km || 
|-id=779 bgcolor=#E9E9E9
| 152779 ||  || — || September 9, 1999 || Socorro || LINEAR || — || align=right | 5.3 km || 
|-id=780 bgcolor=#d6d6d6
| 152780 ||  || — || September 9, 1999 || Socorro || LINEAR || — || align=right | 4.7 km || 
|-id=781 bgcolor=#d6d6d6
| 152781 ||  || — || September 10, 1999 || Socorro || LINEAR || — || align=right | 4.2 km || 
|-id=782 bgcolor=#d6d6d6
| 152782 ||  || — || September 8, 1999 || Socorro || LINEAR || — || align=right | 6.5 km || 
|-id=783 bgcolor=#E9E9E9
| 152783 ||  || — || September 7, 1999 || Catalina || CSS || — || align=right | 4.8 km || 
|-id=784 bgcolor=#E9E9E9
| 152784 ||  || — || September 8, 1999 || Catalina || CSS || — || align=right | 6.3 km || 
|-id=785 bgcolor=#d6d6d6
| 152785 ||  || — || September 7, 1999 || Socorro || LINEAR || EOS || align=right | 3.8 km || 
|-id=786 bgcolor=#E9E9E9
| 152786 || 1999 TS || — || October 1, 1999 || Višnjan Observatory || K. Korlević || GEF || align=right | 2.7 km || 
|-id=787 bgcolor=#FFC2E0
| 152787 ||  || — || October 7, 1999 || Socorro || LINEAR || AMO || align=right data-sort-value="0.68" | 680 m || 
|-id=788 bgcolor=#d6d6d6
| 152788 ||  || — || October 4, 1999 || Socorro || LINEAR || — || align=right | 4.7 km || 
|-id=789 bgcolor=#d6d6d6
| 152789 ||  || — || October 1, 1999 || Catalina || CSS || — || align=right | 4.3 km || 
|-id=790 bgcolor=#d6d6d6
| 152790 ||  || — || October 3, 1999 || Kitt Peak || Spacewatch || KOR || align=right | 2.2 km || 
|-id=791 bgcolor=#d6d6d6
| 152791 ||  || — || October 6, 1999 || Kitt Peak || Spacewatch || KOR || align=right | 2.5 km || 
|-id=792 bgcolor=#E9E9E9
| 152792 ||  || — || October 7, 1999 || Kitt Peak || Spacewatch || — || align=right | 3.3 km || 
|-id=793 bgcolor=#d6d6d6
| 152793 ||  || — || October 12, 1999 || Kitt Peak || Spacewatch || — || align=right | 5.1 km || 
|-id=794 bgcolor=#d6d6d6
| 152794 ||  || — || October 14, 1999 || Kitt Peak || Spacewatch || EOS || align=right | 3.4 km || 
|-id=795 bgcolor=#E9E9E9
| 152795 ||  || — || October 4, 1999 || Socorro || LINEAR || — || align=right | 4.4 km || 
|-id=796 bgcolor=#d6d6d6
| 152796 ||  || — || October 4, 1999 || Socorro || LINEAR || — || align=right | 4.4 km || 
|-id=797 bgcolor=#d6d6d6
| 152797 ||  || — || October 4, 1999 || Socorro || LINEAR || TEL || align=right | 3.0 km || 
|-id=798 bgcolor=#d6d6d6
| 152798 ||  || — || October 4, 1999 || Socorro || LINEAR || — || align=right | 5.3 km || 
|-id=799 bgcolor=#d6d6d6
| 152799 ||  || — || October 6, 1999 || Socorro || LINEAR || EOS || align=right | 3.2 km || 
|-id=800 bgcolor=#d6d6d6
| 152800 ||  || — || October 6, 1999 || Socorro || LINEAR || HYG || align=right | 4.9 km || 
|}

152801–152900 

|-bgcolor=#d6d6d6
| 152801 ||  || — || October 7, 1999 || Socorro || LINEAR || — || align=right | 3.5 km || 
|-id=802 bgcolor=#d6d6d6
| 152802 ||  || — || October 9, 1999 || Socorro || LINEAR || — || align=right | 4.6 km || 
|-id=803 bgcolor=#d6d6d6
| 152803 ||  || — || October 10, 1999 || Socorro || LINEAR || — || align=right | 5.0 km || 
|-id=804 bgcolor=#d6d6d6
| 152804 ||  || — || October 10, 1999 || Socorro || LINEAR || HYG || align=right | 4.2 km || 
|-id=805 bgcolor=#d6d6d6
| 152805 ||  || — || October 10, 1999 || Socorro || LINEAR || — || align=right | 5.9 km || 
|-id=806 bgcolor=#d6d6d6
| 152806 ||  || — || October 12, 1999 || Socorro || LINEAR || EUP || align=right | 6.2 km || 
|-id=807 bgcolor=#d6d6d6
| 152807 ||  || — || October 12, 1999 || Socorro || LINEAR || — || align=right | 4.9 km || 
|-id=808 bgcolor=#d6d6d6
| 152808 ||  || — || October 12, 1999 || Socorro || LINEAR || — || align=right | 5.7 km || 
|-id=809 bgcolor=#d6d6d6
| 152809 ||  || — || October 12, 1999 || Socorro || LINEAR || — || align=right | 7.1 km || 
|-id=810 bgcolor=#d6d6d6
| 152810 ||  || — || October 4, 1999 || Catalina || CSS || — || align=right | 4.3 km || 
|-id=811 bgcolor=#E9E9E9
| 152811 ||  || — || October 4, 1999 || Catalina || CSS || — || align=right | 4.7 km || 
|-id=812 bgcolor=#d6d6d6
| 152812 ||  || — || October 7, 1999 || Catalina || CSS || — || align=right | 8.0 km || 
|-id=813 bgcolor=#d6d6d6
| 152813 ||  || — || October 9, 1999 || Socorro || LINEAR || — || align=right | 4.1 km || 
|-id=814 bgcolor=#d6d6d6
| 152814 ||  || — || October 12, 1999 || Kitt Peak || Spacewatch || — || align=right | 4.7 km || 
|-id=815 bgcolor=#d6d6d6
| 152815 ||  || — || October 3, 1999 || Socorro || LINEAR || — || align=right | 4.8 km || 
|-id=816 bgcolor=#d6d6d6
| 152816 ||  || — || October 9, 1999 || Socorro || LINEAR || KOR || align=right | 2.9 km || 
|-id=817 bgcolor=#d6d6d6
| 152817 ||  || — || October 3, 1999 || Kitt Peak || Spacewatch || — || align=right | 3.9 km || 
|-id=818 bgcolor=#d6d6d6
| 152818 ||  || — || October 29, 1999 || Ondřejov || L. Kotková || — || align=right | 4.4 km || 
|-id=819 bgcolor=#d6d6d6
| 152819 ||  || — || October 29, 1999 || Kitt Peak || Spacewatch || — || align=right | 3.4 km || 
|-id=820 bgcolor=#d6d6d6
| 152820 ||  || — || October 30, 1999 || Kitt Peak || Spacewatch || — || align=right | 4.2 km || 
|-id=821 bgcolor=#d6d6d6
| 152821 ||  || — || October 31, 1999 || Kitt Peak || Spacewatch || — || align=right | 3.2 km || 
|-id=822 bgcolor=#E9E9E9
| 152822 ||  || — || October 31, 1999 || Kitt Peak || Spacewatch || INO || align=right | 2.5 km || 
|-id=823 bgcolor=#d6d6d6
| 152823 ||  || — || October 18, 1999 || Kitt Peak || Spacewatch || — || align=right | 5.0 km || 
|-id=824 bgcolor=#d6d6d6
| 152824 ||  || — || October 29, 1999 || Catalina || CSS || — || align=right | 6.0 km || 
|-id=825 bgcolor=#d6d6d6
| 152825 ||  || — || October 31, 1999 || Catalina || CSS || — || align=right | 4.3 km || 
|-id=826 bgcolor=#d6d6d6
| 152826 ||  || — || October 29, 1999 || Catalina || CSS || — || align=right | 5.6 km || 
|-id=827 bgcolor=#fefefe
| 152827 ||  || — || November 8, 1999 || Majorca || R. Pacheco, Á. López J. || — || align=right | 1.3 km || 
|-id=828 bgcolor=#FFC2E0
| 152828 ||  || — || November 12, 1999 || Socorro || LINEAR || APOPHA || align=right data-sort-value="0.21" | 210 m || 
|-id=829 bgcolor=#d6d6d6
| 152829 ||  || — || November 3, 1999 || Socorro || LINEAR || THM || align=right | 3.5 km || 
|-id=830 bgcolor=#fefefe
| 152830 Dinkinesh ||  ||  || November 4, 1999 || Socorro || LINEAR || — || align=right | 1.0 km || 
|-id=831 bgcolor=#d6d6d6
| 152831 ||  || — || November 4, 1999 || Socorro || LINEAR || — || align=right | 4.2 km || 
|-id=832 bgcolor=#d6d6d6
| 152832 ||  || — || November 4, 1999 || Socorro || LINEAR || — || align=right | 4.2 km || 
|-id=833 bgcolor=#d6d6d6
| 152833 ||  || — || November 4, 1999 || Socorro || LINEAR || — || align=right | 7.2 km || 
|-id=834 bgcolor=#d6d6d6
| 152834 ||  || — || November 4, 1999 || Socorro || LINEAR || — || align=right | 5.5 km || 
|-id=835 bgcolor=#d6d6d6
| 152835 ||  || — || November 4, 1999 || Kitt Peak || Spacewatch || 7:4 || align=right | 2.5 km || 
|-id=836 bgcolor=#d6d6d6
| 152836 ||  || — || November 3, 1999 || Socorro || LINEAR || — || align=right | 4.5 km || 
|-id=837 bgcolor=#d6d6d6
| 152837 ||  || — || November 9, 1999 || Socorro || LINEAR || EOS || align=right | 3.1 km || 
|-id=838 bgcolor=#d6d6d6
| 152838 ||  || — || November 9, 1999 || Socorro || LINEAR || — || align=right | 4.1 km || 
|-id=839 bgcolor=#d6d6d6
| 152839 ||  || — || November 9, 1999 || Socorro || LINEAR || — || align=right | 3.9 km || 
|-id=840 bgcolor=#d6d6d6
| 152840 ||  || — || November 9, 1999 || Socorro || LINEAR || THM || align=right | 3.2 km || 
|-id=841 bgcolor=#fefefe
| 152841 ||  || — || November 9, 1999 || Socorro || LINEAR || — || align=right | 2.0 km || 
|-id=842 bgcolor=#d6d6d6
| 152842 ||  || — || November 9, 1999 || Socorro || LINEAR || THM || align=right | 3.9 km || 
|-id=843 bgcolor=#d6d6d6
| 152843 ||  || — || November 4, 1999 || Kitt Peak || Spacewatch || TEL || align=right | 2.7 km || 
|-id=844 bgcolor=#d6d6d6
| 152844 ||  || — || November 13, 1999 || Catalina || CSS || EOS || align=right | 3.5 km || 
|-id=845 bgcolor=#d6d6d6
| 152845 ||  || — || November 12, 1999 || Socorro || LINEAR || THM || align=right | 2.7 km || 
|-id=846 bgcolor=#d6d6d6
| 152846 ||  || — || November 12, 1999 || Socorro || LINEAR || — || align=right | 3.7 km || 
|-id=847 bgcolor=#d6d6d6
| 152847 ||  || — || November 12, 1999 || Socorro || LINEAR || THM || align=right | 3.5 km || 
|-id=848 bgcolor=#d6d6d6
| 152848 ||  || — || November 14, 1999 || Socorro || LINEAR || EUP || align=right | 7.5 km || 
|-id=849 bgcolor=#fefefe
| 152849 ||  || — || November 14, 1999 || Socorro || LINEAR || FLO || align=right data-sort-value="0.84" | 840 m || 
|-id=850 bgcolor=#fefefe
| 152850 ||  || — || November 9, 1999 || Socorro || LINEAR || — || align=right | 1.0 km || 
|-id=851 bgcolor=#d6d6d6
| 152851 ||  || — || November 15, 1999 || Socorro || LINEAR || KOR || align=right | 2.7 km || 
|-id=852 bgcolor=#d6d6d6
| 152852 ||  || — || November 3, 1999 || Catalina || CSS || — || align=right | 5.6 km || 
|-id=853 bgcolor=#d6d6d6
| 152853 ||  || — || November 2, 1999 || Catalina || CSS || THB || align=right | 6.2 km || 
|-id=854 bgcolor=#d6d6d6
| 152854 ||  || — || November 12, 1999 || Socorro || LINEAR || THM || align=right | 2.9 km || 
|-id=855 bgcolor=#d6d6d6
| 152855 ||  || — || November 3, 1999 || Socorro || LINEAR || — || align=right | 5.2 km || 
|-id=856 bgcolor=#d6d6d6
| 152856 ||  || — || November 28, 1999 || Kitt Peak || Spacewatch || EMA || align=right | 6.6 km || 
|-id=857 bgcolor=#d6d6d6
| 152857 ||  || — || December 6, 1999 || Socorro || LINEAR || — || align=right | 4.5 km || 
|-id=858 bgcolor=#FA8072
| 152858 ||  || — || December 5, 1999 || Anderson Mesa || LONEOS || — || align=right | 2.3 km || 
|-id=859 bgcolor=#fefefe
| 152859 ||  || — || December 7, 1999 || Socorro || LINEAR || — || align=right | 1.4 km || 
|-id=860 bgcolor=#d6d6d6
| 152860 ||  || — || December 7, 1999 || Socorro || LINEAR || — || align=right | 5.1 km || 
|-id=861 bgcolor=#d6d6d6
| 152861 ||  || — || December 7, 1999 || Socorro || LINEAR || HYG || align=right | 4.5 km || 
|-id=862 bgcolor=#d6d6d6
| 152862 ||  || — || December 7, 1999 || Socorro || LINEAR || URS || align=right | 6.1 km || 
|-id=863 bgcolor=#d6d6d6
| 152863 ||  || — || December 11, 1999 || Socorro || LINEAR || slow || align=right | 6.7 km || 
|-id=864 bgcolor=#FA8072
| 152864 ||  || — || December 8, 1999 || Kitt Peak || Spacewatch || — || align=right | 2.1 km || 
|-id=865 bgcolor=#d6d6d6
| 152865 ||  || — || December 6, 1999 || Kitt Peak || Spacewatch || — || align=right | 4.0 km || 
|-id=866 bgcolor=#fefefe
| 152866 ||  || — || December 13, 1999 || Kitt Peak || Spacewatch || — || align=right | 1.0 km || 
|-id=867 bgcolor=#fefefe
| 152867 ||  || — || December 13, 1999 || Kitt Peak || Spacewatch || — || align=right | 1.1 km || 
|-id=868 bgcolor=#fefefe
| 152868 ||  || — || December 8, 1999 || Kitt Peak || Spacewatch || — || align=right | 1.1 km || 
|-id=869 bgcolor=#fefefe
| 152869 ||  || — || December 12, 1999 || Kitt Peak || Spacewatch || — || align=right data-sort-value="0.92" | 920 m || 
|-id=870 bgcolor=#fefefe
| 152870 ||  || — || December 27, 1999 || Kitt Peak || Spacewatch || — || align=right data-sort-value="0.76" | 760 m || 
|-id=871 bgcolor=#fefefe
| 152871 ||  || — || December 27, 1999 || Kitt Peak || Spacewatch || — || align=right | 1.1 km || 
|-id=872 bgcolor=#fefefe
| 152872 ||  || — || January 3, 2000 || Socorro || LINEAR || — || align=right | 1.5 km || 
|-id=873 bgcolor=#fefefe
| 152873 ||  || — || January 3, 2000 || Socorro || LINEAR || — || align=right | 1.5 km || 
|-id=874 bgcolor=#fefefe
| 152874 ||  || — || January 3, 2000 || Socorro || LINEAR || — || align=right | 2.3 km || 
|-id=875 bgcolor=#fefefe
| 152875 ||  || — || January 5, 2000 || Ondřejov || P. Kušnirák, P. Pravec || — || align=right | 2.9 km || 
|-id=876 bgcolor=#d6d6d6
| 152876 ||  || — || January 5, 2000 || Socorro || LINEAR || — || align=right | 5.5 km || 
|-id=877 bgcolor=#fefefe
| 152877 ||  || — || January 5, 2000 || Socorro || LINEAR || — || align=right | 1.4 km || 
|-id=878 bgcolor=#fefefe
| 152878 ||  || — || January 5, 2000 || Socorro || LINEAR || — || align=right | 1.4 km || 
|-id=879 bgcolor=#fefefe
| 152879 ||  || — || January 3, 2000 || Socorro || LINEAR || — || align=right | 1.3 km || 
|-id=880 bgcolor=#fefefe
| 152880 ||  || — || January 5, 2000 || Kitt Peak || Spacewatch || — || align=right | 1.3 km || 
|-id=881 bgcolor=#fefefe
| 152881 ||  || — || January 7, 2000 || Socorro || LINEAR || — || align=right | 1.4 km || 
|-id=882 bgcolor=#fefefe
| 152882 ||  || — || January 21, 2000 || Socorro || LINEAR || PHO || align=right | 2.2 km || 
|-id=883 bgcolor=#fefefe
| 152883 ||  || — || January 26, 2000 || Kitt Peak || Spacewatch || — || align=right | 1.4 km || 
|-id=884 bgcolor=#fefefe
| 152884 ||  || — || January 27, 2000 || Kitt Peak || Spacewatch || — || align=right | 1.1 km || 
|-id=885 bgcolor=#fefefe
| 152885 ||  || — || February 2, 2000 || Socorro || LINEAR || FLO || align=right | 1.2 km || 
|-id=886 bgcolor=#fefefe
| 152886 ||  || — || February 2, 2000 || Socorro || LINEAR || FLO || align=right | 1.6 km || 
|-id=887 bgcolor=#fefefe
| 152887 ||  || — || February 2, 2000 || Socorro || LINEAR || FLO || align=right | 1.0 km || 
|-id=888 bgcolor=#fefefe
| 152888 ||  || — || February 2, 2000 || Socorro || LINEAR || NYS || align=right | 1.0 km || 
|-id=889 bgcolor=#FFC2E0
| 152889 ||  || — || February 5, 2000 || Catalina || CSS || APO +1km || align=right | 1.0 km || 
|-id=890 bgcolor=#fefefe
| 152890 ||  || — || February 1, 2000 || Kitt Peak || Spacewatch || — || align=right | 1.1 km || 
|-id=891 bgcolor=#fefefe
| 152891 ||  || — || February 8, 2000 || Kitt Peak || Spacewatch || — || align=right | 1.0 km || 
|-id=892 bgcolor=#fefefe
| 152892 ||  || — || February 7, 2000 || Kitt Peak || Spacewatch || FLO || align=right | 1.3 km || 
|-id=893 bgcolor=#fefefe
| 152893 ||  || — || February 8, 2000 || Kitt Peak || Spacewatch || FLO || align=right | 1.9 km || 
|-id=894 bgcolor=#fefefe
| 152894 ||  || — || February 8, 2000 || Kitt Peak || Spacewatch || — || align=right | 1.2 km || 
|-id=895 bgcolor=#FFC2E0
| 152895 ||  || — || February 11, 2000 || Socorro || LINEAR || AMO +1km || align=right data-sort-value="0.86" | 860 m || 
|-id=896 bgcolor=#fefefe
| 152896 ||  || — || February 8, 2000 || Socorro || LINEAR || FLO || align=right | 1.8 km || 
|-id=897 bgcolor=#fefefe
| 152897 ||  || — || February 28, 2000 || Socorro || LINEAR || — || align=right | 1.3 km || 
|-id=898 bgcolor=#fefefe
| 152898 ||  || — || February 27, 2000 || Kitt Peak || Spacewatch || — || align=right | 1.1 km || 
|-id=899 bgcolor=#fefefe
| 152899 ||  || — || February 29, 2000 || Socorro || LINEAR || — || align=right | 2.0 km || 
|-id=900 bgcolor=#d6d6d6
| 152900 ||  || — || February 29, 2000 || Socorro || LINEAR || SHU3:2 || align=right | 9.6 km || 
|}

152901–153000 

|-bgcolor=#fefefe
| 152901 ||  || — || February 29, 2000 || Socorro || LINEAR || NYS || align=right | 1.8 km || 
|-id=902 bgcolor=#fefefe
| 152902 ||  || — || February 29, 2000 || Socorro || LINEAR || FLO || align=right | 1.0 km || 
|-id=903 bgcolor=#fefefe
| 152903 ||  || — || February 29, 2000 || Socorro || LINEAR || — || align=right | 1.1 km || 
|-id=904 bgcolor=#fefefe
| 152904 ||  || — || February 29, 2000 || Socorro || LINEAR || — || align=right | 2.2 km || 
|-id=905 bgcolor=#fefefe
| 152905 ||  || — || February 29, 2000 || Socorro || LINEAR || — || align=right | 1.7 km || 
|-id=906 bgcolor=#fefefe
| 152906 ||  || — || February 29, 2000 || Socorro || LINEAR || — || align=right | 1.4 km || 
|-id=907 bgcolor=#fefefe
| 152907 ||  || — || February 29, 2000 || Socorro || LINEAR || V || align=right data-sort-value="0.85" | 850 m || 
|-id=908 bgcolor=#fefefe
| 152908 ||  || — || February 29, 2000 || Socorro || LINEAR || V || align=right | 1.2 km || 
|-id=909 bgcolor=#fefefe
| 152909 ||  || — || February 29, 2000 || Socorro || LINEAR || FLO || align=right | 1.1 km || 
|-id=910 bgcolor=#fefefe
| 152910 ||  || — || February 29, 2000 || Socorro || LINEAR || — || align=right | 1.5 km || 
|-id=911 bgcolor=#fefefe
| 152911 ||  || — || February 29, 2000 || Socorro || LINEAR || FLO || align=right | 1.7 km || 
|-id=912 bgcolor=#fefefe
| 152912 ||  || — || February 29, 2000 || Socorro || LINEAR || V || align=right | 1.0 km || 
|-id=913 bgcolor=#fefefe
| 152913 ||  || — || February 29, 2000 || Socorro || LINEAR || — || align=right | 1.7 km || 
|-id=914 bgcolor=#fefefe
| 152914 ||  || — || February 29, 2000 || Socorro || LINEAR || FLOfast? || align=right | 1.0 km || 
|-id=915 bgcolor=#fefefe
| 152915 ||  || — || February 27, 2000 || Kitt Peak || Spacewatch || — || align=right | 1.9 km || 
|-id=916 bgcolor=#fefefe
| 152916 ||  || — || March 2, 2000 || Kitt Peak || Spacewatch || NYS || align=right | 1.7 km || 
|-id=917 bgcolor=#fefefe
| 152917 ||  || — || March 2, 2000 || Kitt Peak || Spacewatch || NYS || align=right data-sort-value="0.91" | 910 m || 
|-id=918 bgcolor=#fefefe
| 152918 ||  || — || March 4, 2000 || Socorro || LINEAR || PHO || align=right | 2.8 km || 
|-id=919 bgcolor=#fefefe
| 152919 ||  || — || March 5, 2000 || Socorro || LINEAR || PHO || align=right | 2.0 km || 
|-id=920 bgcolor=#fefefe
| 152920 ||  || — || March 5, 2000 || Socorro || LINEAR || — || align=right | 1.3 km || 
|-id=921 bgcolor=#fefefe
| 152921 ||  || — || March 5, 2000 || Socorro || LINEAR || FLO || align=right | 2.3 km || 
|-id=922 bgcolor=#fefefe
| 152922 ||  || — || March 3, 2000 || Kitt Peak || Spacewatch || — || align=right | 1.4 km || 
|-id=923 bgcolor=#fefefe
| 152923 ||  || — || March 10, 2000 || Socorro || LINEAR || — || align=right | 1.2 km || 
|-id=924 bgcolor=#fefefe
| 152924 ||  || — || March 10, 2000 || Socorro || LINEAR || — || align=right | 1.3 km || 
|-id=925 bgcolor=#fefefe
| 152925 ||  || — || March 10, 2000 || Socorro || LINEAR || — || align=right | 1.2 km || 
|-id=926 bgcolor=#fefefe
| 152926 ||  || — || March 5, 2000 || Socorro || LINEAR || FLO || align=right | 1.2 km || 
|-id=927 bgcolor=#fefefe
| 152927 ||  || — || March 5, 2000 || Socorro || LINEAR || FLO || align=right | 1.2 km || 
|-id=928 bgcolor=#fefefe
| 152928 ||  || — || March 9, 2000 || Socorro || LINEAR || — || align=right | 1.3 km || 
|-id=929 bgcolor=#fefefe
| 152929 ||  || — || March 9, 2000 || Socorro || LINEAR || — || align=right | 1.3 km || 
|-id=930 bgcolor=#fefefe
| 152930 ||  || — || March 14, 2000 || Kitt Peak || Spacewatch || FLO || align=right | 1.1 km || 
|-id=931 bgcolor=#FFC2E0
| 152931 ||  || — || March 15, 2000 || Socorro || LINEAR || ATE +1kmmoon || align=right | 1.6 km || 
|-id=932 bgcolor=#fefefe
| 152932 ||  || — || March 11, 2000 || Anderson Mesa || LONEOS || NYS || align=right | 1.1 km || 
|-id=933 bgcolor=#fefefe
| 152933 ||  || — || March 11, 2000 || Socorro || LINEAR || — || align=right | 2.0 km || 
|-id=934 bgcolor=#fefefe
| 152934 ||  || — || March 11, 2000 || Socorro || LINEAR || NYS || align=right data-sort-value="0.79" | 790 m || 
|-id=935 bgcolor=#fefefe
| 152935 ||  || — || March 11, 2000 || Anderson Mesa || LONEOS || — || align=right | 1.0 km || 
|-id=936 bgcolor=#fefefe
| 152936 ||  || — || March 11, 2000 || Anderson Mesa || LONEOS || FLO || align=right | 1.8 km || 
|-id=937 bgcolor=#fefefe
| 152937 ||  || — || March 3, 2000 || Socorro || LINEAR || FLO || align=right | 1.1 km || 
|-id=938 bgcolor=#fefefe
| 152938 ||  || — || March 3, 2000 || Socorro || LINEAR || — || align=right | 1.3 km || 
|-id=939 bgcolor=#fefefe
| 152939 ||  || — || March 27, 2000 || Kitt Peak || Spacewatch || NYS || align=right data-sort-value="0.86" | 860 m || 
|-id=940 bgcolor=#fefefe
| 152940 ||  || — || March 25, 2000 || Kitt Peak || Spacewatch || V || align=right | 1.1 km || 
|-id=941 bgcolor=#FFC2E0
| 152941 ||  || — || March 30, 2000 || Kitt Peak || Spacewatch || APO +1km || align=right data-sort-value="0.82" | 820 m || 
|-id=942 bgcolor=#FFC2E0
| 152942 ||  || — || March 30, 2000 || Socorro || LINEAR || AMO +1km || align=right | 1.6 km || 
|-id=943 bgcolor=#fefefe
| 152943 ||  || — || March 26, 2000 || Socorro || LINEAR || — || align=right | 4.4 km || 
|-id=944 bgcolor=#fefefe
| 152944 ||  || — || March 29, 2000 || Socorro || LINEAR || — || align=right | 1.9 km || 
|-id=945 bgcolor=#fefefe
| 152945 ||  || — || March 27, 2000 || Anderson Mesa || LONEOS || — || align=right | 4.5 km || 
|-id=946 bgcolor=#fefefe
| 152946 ||  || — || March 27, 2000 || Anderson Mesa || LONEOS || V || align=right data-sort-value="0.89" | 890 m || 
|-id=947 bgcolor=#fefefe
| 152947 ||  || — || March 27, 2000 || Anderson Mesa || LONEOS || V || align=right | 1.0 km || 
|-id=948 bgcolor=#FA8072
| 152948 ||  || — || March 29, 2000 || Socorro || LINEAR || — || align=right | 1.2 km || 
|-id=949 bgcolor=#fefefe
| 152949 ||  || — || March 26, 2000 || Anderson Mesa || LONEOS || — || align=right | 1.4 km || 
|-id=950 bgcolor=#fefefe
| 152950 ||  || — || March 30, 2000 || Socorro || LINEAR || — || align=right | 1.6 km || 
|-id=951 bgcolor=#fefefe
| 152951 ||  || — || March 29, 2000 || Kitt Peak || Spacewatch || — || align=right | 1.0 km || 
|-id=952 bgcolor=#FFC2E0
| 152952 ||  || — || April 2, 2000 || Socorro || LINEAR || AMO +1km || align=right data-sort-value="0.78" | 780 m || 
|-id=953 bgcolor=#E9E9E9
| 152953 ||  || — || April 5, 2000 || Socorro || LINEAR || — || align=right | 1.8 km || 
|-id=954 bgcolor=#fefefe
| 152954 ||  || — || April 5, 2000 || Socorro || LINEAR || — || align=right | 1.6 km || 
|-id=955 bgcolor=#fefefe
| 152955 ||  || — || April 5, 2000 || Socorro || LINEAR || — || align=right | 1.5 km || 
|-id=956 bgcolor=#fefefe
| 152956 ||  || — || April 5, 2000 || Socorro || LINEAR || V || align=right data-sort-value="0.95" | 950 m || 
|-id=957 bgcolor=#fefefe
| 152957 ||  || — || April 5, 2000 || Socorro || LINEAR || — || align=right | 1.1 km || 
|-id=958 bgcolor=#fefefe
| 152958 ||  || — || April 5, 2000 || Socorro || LINEAR || MAS || align=right | 1.0 km || 
|-id=959 bgcolor=#fefefe
| 152959 ||  || — || April 5, 2000 || Socorro || LINEAR || — || align=right | 1.1 km || 
|-id=960 bgcolor=#fefefe
| 152960 ||  || — || April 5, 2000 || Socorro || LINEAR || NYS || align=right | 1.2 km || 
|-id=961 bgcolor=#fefefe
| 152961 ||  || — || April 5, 2000 || Socorro || LINEAR || — || align=right | 2.8 km || 
|-id=962 bgcolor=#fefefe
| 152962 ||  || — || April 5, 2000 || Socorro || LINEAR || — || align=right | 1.2 km || 
|-id=963 bgcolor=#fefefe
| 152963 ||  || — || April 5, 2000 || Socorro || LINEAR || — || align=right | 1.1 km || 
|-id=964 bgcolor=#FFC2E0
| 152964 ||  || — || April 4, 2000 || Socorro || LINEAR || APO +1km || align=right data-sort-value="0.79" | 790 m || 
|-id=965 bgcolor=#fefefe
| 152965 ||  || — || April 4, 2000 || Socorro || LINEAR || ERI || align=right | 2.9 km || 
|-id=966 bgcolor=#fefefe
| 152966 ||  || — || April 7, 2000 || Socorro || LINEAR || — || align=right | 2.7 km || 
|-id=967 bgcolor=#fefefe
| 152967 ||  || — || April 7, 2000 || Socorro || LINEAR || — || align=right | 3.1 km || 
|-id=968 bgcolor=#fefefe
| 152968 ||  || — || April 2, 2000 || Kitt Peak || Spacewatch || — || align=right | 1.4 km || 
|-id=969 bgcolor=#fefefe
| 152969 ||  || — || April 2, 2000 || Kitt Peak || Spacewatch || NYS || align=right data-sort-value="0.91" | 910 m || 
|-id=970 bgcolor=#fefefe
| 152970 ||  || — || April 5, 2000 || Kitt Peak || Spacewatch || NYS || align=right data-sort-value="0.76" | 760 m || 
|-id=971 bgcolor=#fefefe
| 152971 ||  || — || April 5, 2000 || Kitt Peak || Spacewatch || NYS || align=right | 1.1 km || 
|-id=972 bgcolor=#fefefe
| 152972 ||  || — || April 5, 2000 || Kitt Peak || Spacewatch || — || align=right | 1.3 km || 
|-id=973 bgcolor=#fefefe
| 152973 ||  || — || April 6, 2000 || Kitt Peak || Spacewatch || ERI || align=right | 2.4 km || 
|-id=974 bgcolor=#fefefe
| 152974 ||  || — || April 7, 2000 || Socorro || LINEAR || — || align=right | 1.7 km || 
|-id=975 bgcolor=#fefefe
| 152975 ||  || — || April 8, 2000 || Socorro || LINEAR || V || align=right | 1.1 km || 
|-id=976 bgcolor=#fefefe
| 152976 ||  || — || April 4, 2000 || Anderson Mesa || LONEOS || NYS || align=right | 3.1 km || 
|-id=977 bgcolor=#fefefe
| 152977 ||  || — || April 7, 2000 || Anderson Mesa || LONEOS || — || align=right | 1.6 km || 
|-id=978 bgcolor=#FFC2E0
| 152978 ||  || — || April 13, 2000 || Anderson Mesa || LONEOS || APOPHA || align=right data-sort-value="0.53" | 530 m || 
|-id=979 bgcolor=#fefefe
| 152979 ||  || — || April 5, 2000 || Socorro || LINEAR || — || align=right | 1.5 km || 
|-id=980 bgcolor=#fefefe
| 152980 ||  || — || April 5, 2000 || Socorro || LINEAR || MAS || align=right | 1.2 km || 
|-id=981 bgcolor=#fefefe
| 152981 ||  || — || April 6, 2000 || Socorro || LINEAR || — || align=right | 1.2 km || 
|-id=982 bgcolor=#fefefe
| 152982 ||  || — || April 7, 2000 || Anderson Mesa || LONEOS || FLO || align=right | 1.1 km || 
|-id=983 bgcolor=#fefefe
| 152983 ||  || — || April 7, 2000 || Anderson Mesa || LONEOS || — || align=right | 1.3 km || 
|-id=984 bgcolor=#fefefe
| 152984 ||  || — || April 8, 2000 || Socorro || LINEAR || NYS || align=right | 1.3 km || 
|-id=985 bgcolor=#fefefe
| 152985 Kenkellermann ||  ||  || April 4, 2000 || Anderson Mesa || L. H. Wasserman || V || align=right | 1.1 km || 
|-id=986 bgcolor=#fefefe
| 152986 ||  || — || April 26, 2000 || Kitt Peak || Spacewatch || — || align=right | 1.1 km || 
|-id=987 bgcolor=#fefefe
| 152987 ||  || — || April 27, 2000 || Socorro || LINEAR || PHO || align=right | 2.3 km || 
|-id=988 bgcolor=#fefefe
| 152988 ||  || — || April 29, 2000 || Socorro || LINEAR || — || align=right | 2.0 km || 
|-id=989 bgcolor=#fefefe
| 152989 ||  || — || April 30, 2000 || Socorro || LINEAR || — || align=right | 1.6 km || 
|-id=990 bgcolor=#fefefe
| 152990 ||  || — || April 24, 2000 || Anderson Mesa || LONEOS || FLO || align=right | 1.0 km || 
|-id=991 bgcolor=#fefefe
| 152991 ||  || — || April 30, 2000 || Socorro || LINEAR || — || align=right | 1.6 km || 
|-id=992 bgcolor=#fefefe
| 152992 ||  || — || April 28, 2000 || Kitt Peak || Spacewatch || — || align=right | 1.0 km || 
|-id=993 bgcolor=#fefefe
| 152993 ||  || — || April 26, 2000 || Anderson Mesa || LONEOS || — || align=right | 1.6 km || 
|-id=994 bgcolor=#fefefe
| 152994 ||  || — || April 26, 2000 || Anderson Mesa || LONEOS || V || align=right | 1.2 km || 
|-id=995 bgcolor=#fefefe
| 152995 ||  || — || April 29, 2000 || Socorro || LINEAR || — || align=right | 1.6 km || 
|-id=996 bgcolor=#fefefe
| 152996 ||  || — || April 25, 2000 || Anderson Mesa || LONEOS || V || align=right | 1.4 km || 
|-id=997 bgcolor=#fefefe
| 152997 ||  || — || April 24, 2000 || Anderson Mesa || LONEOS || NYS || align=right | 1.1 km || 
|-id=998 bgcolor=#fefefe
| 152998 ||  || — || April 28, 2000 || Anderson Mesa || LONEOS || PHO || align=right | 1.6 km || 
|-id=999 bgcolor=#fefefe
| 152999 ||  || — || April 30, 2000 || Anderson Mesa || LONEOS || — || align=right | 1.7 km || 
|-id=000 bgcolor=#fefefe
| 153000 ||  || — || April 30, 2000 || Anderson Mesa || LONEOS || MAS || align=right | 1.4 km || 
|}

References

External links 
 Discovery Circumstances: Numbered Minor Planets (150001)–(155000) (IAU Minor Planet Center)

0152